The following is a list of former (inactivated or decommissioned) U.S. Army medical units – both fixed and deployable – with dates of inactivations, demobilizations, or redesignations.

Named hospitals

Civil War era
Note: an asterisk (*) denotes a civilian hospital temporarily commandeered by the Union Army.
Baxter General Hospital, Burlington, Vermont (1865) 
Brown General Hospital
Freedman's Hospital
Camp Letterman, an extensive field hospital used to treat the wounded after the Battle of Gettysburg, 1863
McDougall Hospital, Westchester, New York (state) (1862). (The location is now within The Bronx, New York City).
Mower Hospital (1865)
Satterlee Hospital (1865)
Sloan General Hospital, Montpelier, Vermont (1865)
Smith General Hospital, Brattleboro, Vermont (1865)
Indianapolis City Hospital*
Yale – New Haven Hospital* (as the "Knight United States Army General Hospital")
York United States Army Hospital

Spanish–American War

World War I 
Rockefeller War Demonstration Hospital (Also known as United States Army Auxiliary Hospital No. 1.), 5 April 1919
United States Army General Hospital, Fort Bayard, New Mexico, Transferred to United States Public Health Service, 1920

World War II

Army & Navy General Hospital Annex (1946) Eastman Hotel, Hot Springs, Arkansas
Ashburn General Hospital, McKinney, Texas, Transferred to the Veterans Administration, 12 December 1945. Named for Colonel Percy Moreau Ashburn, first Commandant of the Medical Field Service School.

Ashford General Hospital, operating in the Greenbrier Hotel, White Sulfur Springs, West Virginia.  Named after Colonel Bailey K. Ashford, Medical Corps, United States Army.  The hotel was returned to its former owners after the war.
Birmingham General Hospital, Van Nuys, California, closed and transferred to the Veterans Administration 31 March 1946. Named for Brigadier General Henry Patrick Birmingham, Medical Corps, United States Army.
Darnall General Hospital, operating in the former Kentucky State Hospital. Not to be confused with the current Carl R. Darnall Army Medical Center at Fort Hood, Texas, later named after the same individual.
Churchill Hospital (1945)
Deshon General Hospital, in the former Butler Hospital
DeWitt General Hospital, Auburn, California, 31 December 1945. Named for Brigadier General Calvin DeWitt, Medical Corps, United States Army. 
Dibble General Hospital, Palo Alto, California, 31 July 1946. Named for Colonel John Dibble, Medical Corps, United States Army.
England General Hospital, Atlantic City, New Jersey.  Operated in the former Haddon Hall, Cedarcraft Hotel, Colton-Manor Hotel, Dennis Hotel, Keystone Hotel, New England Hotel, Rydal Hotel, Traymore Hotel, Warwick Hotel, and Chalfone Hotel
Gardiner General Hospital, Chicago Beach Hotel, Chicago, Illinois
Halloran General Hospital, Staten Island, NYC (1942-1947); named after Col. Paul Stacey Halloran; constructed as the Willowbrook State School but taken by the federal government before opening; returned to the state of New York in 1947
Hammond General Hospital, Modesto, California, December, 1945. Named for Surgeon General of the Union Army during the American Civil War
Hoff General Hospital, Santa Barbara, California, named for Colonel John van Rennselaer Hoff, Medical Corps
Hoff General Hospital Annex, Jefferson School, Santa Barbara, California
Malinta Tunnel General Hospital, Corregidor Island, Philippines, 6 May 1942
Mason General Hospital, Long Island, New York (1944–1946; psychiatric facility; the film Let There Be Light was made there.)
Oliver General Hospital, Forest Hills Hotel
Ream General Hospital, Breakers Hotel
Rhoads General Hospital, Utica, New York (1946) Named after Colonel Thomas Leidy Rhoads, a career Army surgeon.
Rhoads General Hospital Annex, Marcy NYA Facility, Utica, New York (1946)
Sternberg General Hospital, Manila, Philippines, January 1942
Torney General Hospital, El Mirador Hotel November, 1945. Named for Brigadier General George Henry Torney, former Surgeon General of the Army
Wakeman General and Convalescent Hospital, Camp Atterbury, Edinburgh, Indiana

Later
Cutler Army Community Hospital, Fort Devens, Massachusetts (1995)
DeWitt Army Community Hospital, Fort Belvoir, Virginia. (2011) Named for Colonel Ogden Dewitt, former Chief of Surgery, Walter Reed General Hospital.
Army-Navy Hospital Hot Springs, Arkansas (1952)
Fitzsimons Army Medical Center (1999)

Frankfurt Army Regional Medical Center (1995)
Gorgas Army Hospital, Canal Zone (1997)
Hawley Army Hospital, Fort Benjamin Harrison, Indiana, 30 September 1995
Letterman Army Medical Center (1994)
McCornack General Hospital, Pasadena, California (1949). Named for Brigadier Condon C. McCornack, Medical Corps, United States Army
Percy Jones Army Hospital (1954)
Silas B. Hays Army Community Hospital, Fort Ord, California (1995)
Valley Forge General Hospital (1942–1974)
Walson Army Hospital, Fort Dix, New Jersey (1960-1992). Transferred to the Air Force as part of Fort Dix BRAC action
Walter Reed Army Medical Center (2011)
Walter Reed General Hospital Annex, on the campus of the former National Park College. (1942-1974) Although the Army still retains portions of the property as the Forest Glen Annex of Fort Detrick, Maryland, all on-site patient care operations ceased when the Heaton Pavilion (Building 2) on the Main Campus at Walter Reed Army Medical Center opened for patient care in 1974.

Deployable hospitals
Civil War
Depot Field Hospital (186?), City Point, Virginia

Numbered general hospitals

World War I

U.S. Army General Hospital No. 1, Williamsbridge, New York City (This location, Columbia Oval, is now within the Norwood, not Williamsbridge neighborhood of the Bronx.) This hospital was previously Columbia University's Columbia War Hospital. Closed in October 1919
U.S. Army General Hospital No. 2, Fort McHenry, Maryland, December 1919
U.S. Army General Hospital No. 3, Colonia, New Jersey, October 1919
U.S. Army General Hospital No. 4, Fort Porter, New York, October 1919
U.S. Army General Hospital No. 5, Fort Ontario, New York
U.S. Army General Hospital No. 6, Fort McPherson, Georgia, December 1919
U.S. Army General Hospital No. 7, Roland Park, Maryland, December 1919
U.S. Army General Hospital No. 8, Otisville, New York, December 1919
U.S. Army General Hospital No. 9, Lakewood, New Jersey, May 1919
U.S. Army General Hospital No. 10, Boston, Massachusetts, June 1919
U.S. Army General Hospital No. 11, Cape May, New Jersey, August 1919
U.S. Army General Hospital No. 12, Biltmore, North Carolina, August 1919
U.S. Army General Hospital No. 13, Dansville, New York, March 1919
U.S. Army General Hospital No. 14, Fort Oglethorpe, Georgia, June 1919
U.S. Army General Hospital No. 15, Corpus Christi, Texas, May 1919
U.S. Army General Hospital No. 16, New Haven Connecticut, August 1919
U.S. Army General Hospital No. 17, Markleton, Pennsylvania, March 1919
U.S. Army General Hospital No. 18, Waynesville, North Carolina, March 1919
U.S. Army General Hospital No. 19, Azalea, North Carolina, December 1919
U.S. Army General Hospital No. 20, Whipple Barracks, Arizona, December 1919
U.S. Army General Hospital No. 21, retained as Fitzsimmons General Hospital
U.S. Army General Hospital No. 22, Philadelphia, Pennsylvania, June 1919
U.S. Army General Hospital No. 23, Hot Springs, North Carolina, March 1919
U.S. Army General Hospital No. 24, Park View, Pennsylvania, July 1919
U.S. Army General Hospital No. 25, Fort Benjamin Harrison, Indiana, August 1919
U.S. Army General Hospital No. 26, Fort Des Moines, Iowa, October, 1919
U.S. Army General Hospital No. 27, Fort Douglas, Utah, October 1919
U.S. Army General Hospital No. 28, Fort Sheridan, Illinois, December 1919
U.S. Army General Hospital No. 29, Fort Snelling, Minnesota, August 1919
U.S. Army General Hospital No. 30, Plattsburg Barracks, New York, October 1919
U.S. Army General Hospital No. 31, Carlisle Barracks, Pennsylvania, December, 1919
U.S. Army General Hospital No. 32, Chicago, Illinois, June 1919
U.S. Army General Hospital No. 33, Fort Logan H. Roots, Arkansas, June 1919
U.S. Army General Hospital No. 34, East Norfolk, Massachusetts, January 1919
U.S. Army General Hospital No. 35, West Baden, Indiana, April 1919
U.S. Army General Hospital No. 36, Detroit, Michigan, July 1919
U.S. Army General Hospital No. 37, Madison Barracks, New York, March 1919
U.S. Army General Hospital No. 38, East View, New York, March 1919
U.S. Army General Hospital No. 39, Long Beach, New York, March 1919
U.S. Army General Hospital No. 40, St. Louis, Missouri, June 1919
U.S. Army General Hospital No. 41, Fox Hills, Staten Island, New York, December 1919
U.S. Army General Hospital No. 42, Spartanburg, South Carolina, September 1919
U.S. Army General Hospital No. 43, Hampton, Virginia, March 1920

World War II and later
1st General Hospital, end of World War II
General Hospital No. 1, Limay, Philippines, April 1942
2nd General Hospital
United States, 12 October 1945 
Landstuhl, Germany mid-1990s
General Hospital No. 2, Cabcaben, Philippines, April 1942
3rd General Hospital, Camp Kilmer, New Jersey, 16 September 1945
4th General Hospital, end of World War II
5th General Hospital
end of World War II
Bad Cannstatt, Germany (~1990?)
6th General Hospital, 15 September 1945 at Leghorn, Italy
7th General Hospital, end of World War II
8th General Hospital, end of World War II
9th General Hospital, end of World War II
12th General Hospital, Italy, 15 September 1945
13th General Hospital, end of World War II
15th General Hospital, end of World War II
16th General Hospital
Camp Myles Standish, Massachusetts, 20 November 1945
Redesignated as the 325th General Hospital, 22 April 1947
17th General Hospital, Italy, 25 October 1945
18th General Hospital, Burma, 5 October 1945
19th General Hospital, end of World War II
20th General Hospital, end of World War II
21st General Hospital, Camp Miles Standish, Massachusetts, November 1945
22nd General Hospital, end of World War II
23rd General Hospital, Fort Dix, New Jersey, November 1945
25th General Hospital, Camp Shanks, New York, 20 November 1945
26th General Hospital, 14 September 1945 in Italy
27th General Hospital, end of World War II
28th General Hospital 
Camp d’Orléans, France, 26 September 1945
Osaka, Japan
Croix-Chapeau, France, 1966
29th General Hospital, end of World War II
30th General Hospital, end of World War II
31st General Hospital, end of World War II
32nd General Hospital, end of World War II
33rd General Hospital, Livorno, Italy, 20 September 1945
34th General Hospital, New York, August 1945
35th General Hospital
Philippine Islands, 10 December 1945
Redesignated 23 May 1947 as the 328th General Hospital
36th General Hospital, end of World War II
37th General Hospital, Italy, 25 October 1945
38th General Hospital, Italy, redesignated 384th Station Hospital, 1 January 1946
39th General Hospital (1943-1944), Auckland, New Zealand. Later Cornwall Hospital
40th General Hospital, end of World War II
41st General Hospital, Italy, redesignated 359th Station Hospital 25 November 1943
42nd General Hospital, disbanded 11 November 1944
43rd General Hospital, end of World War II
44th General Hospital, end of World War II
45th General Hospital, Bari, Italy, 30 September 1945
46th General Hospital, end of World War II
47th General Hospital, end of World War II
48th General Hospital, end of World War II
49th General Hospital, end of World War II
50th General Hospital, Camp Kilmer, New Jersey, 27 October 1945
51st General Hospital, end of World War II
52nd General Hospital, United Kingdom, 24 August 1945
53rd General Hospital, end of World War II
54th General Hospital, Tokyo, Japan, 10 December 1945
55th General Hospital (1945) Formed 1943 at Ft Smith, AR.  Deployed to England and France.
56th General Hospital, end of World War II
58th General Hospital, Camp Patrick Henry, Virginia, 16 November 1945
60th General Hospital, end of World War II
61st General Hospital, end of World War II
62nd General Hospital, end of World War II
63rd General Hospital, end of World War II
64th General Hospital, Italy, 20 December 1945
65th General Hospital, end of World War II
67th General Hospital, end of World War II
68th General Hospital, end of World War II
69th General Hospital, end of World War II
70th General Hospital, Italy, 25 October 1945
71st General Hospital, end of World War II
74th General Hospital, end of World War II
76th General Hospital, 7 November 1945
78th General Hospital, Camp Beale, California, reorganized and redesignated as the 348th Station Hospital, 25 July 1943
79th General Hospital, end of World War II
80th General Hospital, end of World War II
81st General Hospital, end of World War II
82nd General Hospital, end of World War II
83rd General Hospital, end of World War II
90th General Hospital, end of World War II
91st General Hospital, Camp Kilmer, New Jersey, 1 February 1946
93rd General Hospital, end of World War II
94th General Hospital, end of World War II
95th General Hospital, end of World War II
96th General Hospital, end of World War II
97th General Hospital, Frankfurt Army Regional Medical Center, Frankfurt, Germany
98th General Hospital, end of World War II
99th General Hospital, end of World War II
100th General Hospital, Camp Kilmer, New Jersey, September 1945
101st General Hospital, end of World War II
102nd General Hospital, end of World War II
103rd General Hospital, end of World War II
104th General Hospital, end of World War II
105th General Hospital, end of World War II
106th General Hospital, end of World War II
107th General Hospital, end of World War II
108th General Hospital, end of World War II
109th General Hospital, end of World War II
110th General Hospital, end of World War II
111th General Hospital, end of World War II
112th General Hospital, Fort Lewis, Washington, 4 October 1945
113th General Hospital, Iran, disbanded 21 August 1945
114th General Hospital (1943-1944), deployed in Kidderminster, England.
115th General Hospital, end of World War II
116th General Hospital, end of World War II
117th General Hospital, end of World War II
118th General Hospital
119th General Hospital, end of World War II
121st General Hospital, end of World War II
122nd General Hospital, end of World War II
123rd General Hospital, end of World War II
124th General Hospital, end of World War II
125th General Hospital, end of World War II
127th General Hospital, end of World War II
128th General Hospital, end of World War II
129th General Hospital, end of World War II
130th General Hospital, end of World War II
131st General Hospital, end of World War II
133rd General Hospital, end of World War II
134th General Hospital, end of World War II
135th General Hospital, end of World War II
137th General Hospital, end of World War II
140th General Hospital, end of World War II
141st General Hospital, end of World War II
142nd General Hospital, end of World War II
142nd General Hospital, end of World War II
147th General Hospital, end of World War II
148th General Hospital, end of World War II
152nd General Hospital, end of World War II
154th General Hospital, end of World War II
155th General Hospital, 21 September 1945
156th General Hospital, end of World War II
157th General Hospital, end of World War II
158th General Hospital, end of World War II
159th General Hospital, end of World War II
160th General Hospital, end of World War II
161st General Hospital, San Juan, Puerto Rico, 15 January 1947
162nd General Hospital, end of World War II
163rd General Hospital, end of World War II
164th General Hospital, Camp Sibert, Georgia, 9 November 1945
165th General Hospital, end of World War II
166th General Hospital, end of World War II
167th General Hospital, end of World War II
168th General Hospital, end of World War II
169th General Hospital, end of World War II
170th General Hospital, inactivated 29 June 1945, but did not officially close until 21 September 1945
172nd General Hospital
China, 30 April 1946
Redesignated 23 May 1949 as the 455th General Hospital
173rd General Hospital, end of World War II
174th General Hospital, end of World War II
176th General Hospital, end of World War II
177th General Hospital, end of World War II
178th General Hospital, end of World War II
179th General Hospital, end of World War II
180th General Hospital, 31 January 1946
181st General Hospital, end of World War II
182nd General Hospital
Camp Kilmer, New Jersey, December 1945
Milwaukee, Wisconsin, reorganized and redesignated as the 452nd General Hospital, 1 February 1949
185th General Hospital, end of World War II
186th General Hospital, end of World War II
187th General Hospital, end of World War II
188th General Hospital, New York Port of Embarkation, New York, 6 December 1945
189th General Hospital, end of World War II
190th General Hospital, disbanded 15 March 1945?
191st General Hospital, 9 January 1946
192nd General Hospital, end of World War II
193rd General Hospital, end of World War II
194th General Hospital, end of World War II
195th General Hospital, end of World War II
196th General Hospital, end of World War II
197th General Hospital, end of World War II
198th General Hospital, end of World War II
199th General Hospital, end of World War II
200th General Hospital, end of World War II
201st General Hospital, end of World War II
202nd General Hospital, end of World War II
203rd General Hospital, Fort Lewis, Washington, 28 November 1945
204th General Hospital, end of World War II
207th General Hospital, disbanded 11 November 1944
208th General Hospital, Helgafell, Iceland, redesignated 327th Station Hospital 2 July 1943
209th General Hospital, disbanded 11 November 1944
210th General Hospital, Fort Gulick, Canal Zone, reorganized and redesignated 368th Station Hospital, 1 April 1944
216th General Hospital, Germany, redesignated 387th Station Hospital 1 April 1946
217th General Hospital, end of World War II
218th General Hospital, Fort Clayton, Canal Zone, reorganized and redesignated 333rd Station Hospital 1 April 1943
220th General Hospital, end of World War II
221st General Hospital, end of World War II
224th General Hospital, end of World War II
226th General Hospital, end of World War II
227th General Hospital, end of World War II
228th General Hospital, end of World War II
229th General Hospital, end of World War II
230th General Hospital, end of World War II
231st General Hospital, end of World War II
232nd General Hospital, end of World War II
234th General Hospital, end of World War II
235th General Hospital, end of World War II
236th General Hospital, end of World War II
237th General Hospital, end of World War II
238th General Hospital, end of World War II
239th General Hospital, end of World War II
240th General Hospital, end of World War II
241st General Hospital, end of World War II
242nd General Hospital, end of World War II
247th General Hospital, end of World War II
250th General Hospital, end of World War II
252nd General Hospital, end of World War II
253rd General Hospital, end of World War II
254th General Hospital, end of World War II
262nd General Hospital, Fort Clayton, Canal Zone, 7 February 1947
263rd General Hospital, end of World War II
279th General Hospital, end of World War II
280th General Hospital, end of World War II
297th General Hospital, end of World War II
298th General Hospital, Camp Kilmer, New Jersey, 5 October 1945
300th General Hospital, Italy, 31 May 1946
305th General Hospital, end of World War II
306th General Hospital, end of World War II
307th General Hospital, end of World War II
317th General Hospital, end of World War II
325th General Hospital, reorganized and redesignated as the 325th Field Hospital, 17 September 1993
452nd General Hospital, Milwaukee, Wisconsin, reorganized and redesignated as the 452nd Combat Support Hospital, 1993
455th General Hospital, Providence, Rhode Island, reorganized and redesignated as the 455th Field Hospital, 17 September 1993
7428th General Hospital (Provisional German PW Hospital), end of World War II
7430th General Hospital (Provisional German PW Hospital), end of World War II
7431st General Hospital (Provisional German PW Hospital), end of World War II
7449th General Hospital (Provisional German PW Hospital), end of World War II
7451st General Hospital (Provisional German PW Hospital), end of World War II
8047th General Hospital (Provisional German PW Hospital), end of World War II
8048th General Hospital (Provisional German PW Hospital), end of World War II
8049th General Hospital (Provisional German PW Hospital), end of World War II
8055th General Hospital (Provisional German PW Hospital), end of World War II
8271st General Hospital (Provisional German PW Hospital), end of World War II
8274th General Hospital (Provisional German PW Hospital), end of World War II
8275th General Hospital (Provisional German PW Hospital), end of World War II
8277th General Hospital (Provisional German PW Hospital), end of World War II
8278th General Hospital (Provisional German PW Hospital), end of World War II
8279th General Hospital (Provisional German PW Hospital), end of World War II

Combat support hospitals

4th Combat Support Hospital, Fort McClellan, Alabama
5th Combat Support Hospital, Fort Bragg, North Carolina, reorganized and redesignated as the 5th Surgical Hospital, 16 April 1982
10th Combat Support Hospital, Fort Carson, Colorado, reorganized and redesignated as the 10th Field Hospital, 16 June 2017
16th Combat Support Hospital, Ft Riley, KS
21st Combat Support Hospital, Fort Hood Texas, reorganized and redesignated as the 11th Field Hospital, 2019
28th Combat Support Hospital, Fort Bragg, North Carolina, April 2020
31st Combat Support Hospital, Fort Bliss, Texas, 
Fort Bliss, Texas, reorganized and redesignated as the 131st Field Hospital, 17 August 1992
(Fort Bliss, Texas, 131st Field Hospital, reorganized and redesignated as the 31st Combat Support Hospital, 16 February 1996)
Reorganized and redesignated as the 131st Field Hospital, April 2018
41st Combat Support Hospital (41st CSH) (Fort Sam Houston, Texas)
46th Combat Support Hospital Fort Devens, Massachusetts, 15 July 1994
47th Combat Support Hospital, Fort Lewis, Washington
48th Combat Support Hospital, Fort George G. Meade, Maryland, November 2017 (US Army Reserve)
67th Combat Support Hospital, Würzburg, Germany, 19 October 2007
75th Combat Support Hospital, Tuscaloosa, Alabama (US Army Reserve)
85th Combat Support Hospital (1976)
86th Combat Support Hospital
Fort Campbell, Kentucky, reorganized and redesignated 86th Evacuation Hospital, 16 March 1984
(Fort Campbell, Kentucky, again reorganized and redesignated 86th Combat Support Hospital, 16 November 1993)
Fort Campbell, Kentucky, reorganized and redesignated as the 586th Field Hospital
94th Combat Support Hospital, Seagoville, Texas (US Army Reserve)
121st Combat Support Hospital (121st CSH) (Camp Humphreys, Pyeongtaek, South Korea)
114th Combat Support Hospital, Minneapolis, Minnesota (US Army Reserve) 
117th Combat Support Hospital, Texas Army National Guard (1976)
128th Combat Support Hospital, Ludwigsburg, Germany
151st Combat Support Hospital, Frankfurt Army Regional Medical Center, Frankfurt, Germany (1995)
212th Combat Support Hospital, Rhine Ordnance Barracks, Germany
228th Combat Support Hospital, Fort Sam Houston, Texas (US Army Reserve)
256th Combat Support Hospital, Twinsburg, Ohio (US Army Reserve)
309th Combat Support Hospital, Hanscom AFB, Massachusetts (US Army Reserve)
324th Combat Support Hospital, Perrine, Florida (US Army Reserve)
325th Combat Support Hospital, Independence, Missouri (US Army Reserve)
328th Combat Support Hospital, San Paulo, California, (US Army Reserve) reorganized and redesignated as the 328th Field Hospital, 12 September 2020
331st Combat Support Hospital, Utica, New York (US Army Reserve)
337th Combat Support Hospital, Indianapolis, Indiana (US Army Reserve) 
339th Combat Support Hospital, Coraopolis, PA (2011) (US Army Reserve)
344th Combat Support Hospital, Fort Totten, New York (US Army Reserve)
345th Combat Support Hospital, Jacksonville, FL (US Army Reserve)
349th Combat Support Hospital, Bell, California (US Army Reserve)
352nd Combat Support Hospital, Camp Parks, California, (US Army Reserve) reorganized and redesignated as the 352nd Field Hospital, 12 September 2020
369th Combat Support Hospital, San Juan, Puerto Rico (US Army Reserve)  
376th Combat Support Hospital, Liverpool, NY (US Army Reserve)
377th Combat Support Hospital, Chattanooga, Tennessee (US Army Reserve)
396th Combat Support Hospital, Vancouver, Washington (US Army Reserve)
399th Combat Support Hospital, Fort Devens, Massachusetts (US Army Reserve)
401st Combat Support Hospital, Grand Rapids, Michigan (US Army Reserve)
405th Combat Support Hospital, Worcester, Massachusetts (US Army Reserve)
452nd Combat Support Hospital, Milwaukee, Wisconsin (US Army Reserve)
801st Combat Support Hospital, Fort Sheridan, Illinois (US Army Reserve) 
865th Combat Support Hospital, Utica, New York (US Army Reserve)
914th Combat Support Hospital, Columbus, Ohio (US Army Reserve)

Evacuation hospitals

World War I

Evacuation Hospital No. 1, Camp Funston, Kansas, May 1919
Evacuation Hospital No. 2, Camp Zachary Taylor, Kentucky, May 1919
Evacuation Hospital No. 3, Camp Dix, New Jersey, April 1919
Evacuation Hospital No. 4, Camp Upton, New York, May 1919
Evacuation Hospital No. 5
Camp Upton, New York, 14 March 1919
Reconstituted 9 November 1936 and Consolidated with the 5th Evacuation Hospital
Evacuation Hospital No. 6, Camp Dix, New Jersey, May 1919
Evacuation Hospital No. 7, Camp Devens, Massachusetts, May 1919
Evacuation Hospital No. 8, Camp Upton, New York, June 1919
Evacuation Hospital No. 9, Camp Dix, New Jersey, July 1919
Evacuation Hospital No. 10, Camp Devens, Massachusetts, June 1919
Evacuation Hospital No. 11, Camp Zachary Taylor, Kentucky, May 1919
Evacuation Hospital No. 12
Camp Dodge, Iowa, 7 July 1919
Reconstituted 10 November 1936 and Consolidated with the 12th Evacuation Hospital
Evacuation Hospital No. 13, Camp Sherman, Ohio, July 1919
Evacuation Hospital No. 14, Camp Sherman, Ohio, May 1919
Evacuation Hospital No. 15
Camp Lewis, Washington, 28 June 1919
Reconstituted 9 November 1936 and Consolidated with the 15th Evacuation Hospital
Evacuation Hospital No. 16, Camp Lewis, Washington, August 1919
Evacuation Hospital No. 17
Evacuation Hospital No. 18, Camp Pike, Arkansas, May 1919
Evacuation Hospital No. 19, Camp Pike, Arkansas, August 1919
Evacuation Hospital No. 20, Camp Zachary Taylor, Kentucky, June 1919
Evacuation Hospital No. 21, Camp Pike, Arkansas, June 1919
Evacuation Hospital No. 22, Camp Upton, New York, June 1919
Evacuation Hospital No. 23, Camp Gordon, Georgia, June 1919
Evacuation Hospital No. 24, Camp Gordon, Georgia, June 1919
Evacuation Hospital No. 25, Camp Dodge, Iowa, May 1919
Evacuation Hospital No. 26, Camp Upton, New York, August 1919
Evacuation Hospital No. 27, Camp Dix, New Jersey, September 1919
Evacuation Hospital No. 28, Camp Sherman, Ohio, July 1919
Evacuation Hospital No. 29, Camp Shelby, Mississippi, July 1919
Evacuation Hospital No. 30, Camp Dix, New Jersey,  August 1919
Evacuation Hospital No. 31, Camp Pike, Arkansas, July 1919
Evacuation Hospital No. 32, Camp Dix, New Jersey, June 1919
Evacuation Hospital No. 33, Camp Dodge, Iowa, May 1919
Evacuation Hospital No. 34, Camp Dix, New Jersey, May 1919
Evacuation Hospital No. 35, Camp Lee, Virginia, April 1919
Evacuation Hospital No. 36, Camp Stuart, Virginia, July 1919
Evacuation Hospital No. 37, Camp Devens, Massachusetts, July 1919
Evacuation Hospital No. 38, Camp Meade, Maryland, December 1918
Evacuation Hospital No. 39, Camp Greenleaf, Georgia, December 1918
Evacuation Hospital No. 40, Camp Greenleaf, Georgia, December 1918
Evacuation Hospital No. 41, Camp Greenleaf, Georgia, December 1918
Evacuation Hospital No. 42, Camp Greenleaf, Georgia, December 1918
Evacuation Hospital No. 43, Camp Greenleaf, Georgia, December 1918
Evacuation Hospital No. 44, Camp Greenleaf, Georgia, December 1918
Evacuation Hospital No. 45, Camp Greenleaf, Georgia, December 1918
Evacuation Hospital No. 46, Camp Greenleaf, Georgia, December 1918
Evacuation Hospital No. 47, Camp Greenleaf, Georgia, December 1918
Evacuation Hospital No. 48, Camp Greenleaf, Georgia, December 1918
Evacuation Hospital No. 49, Camp Dix, New Jersey, August 1919
Evacuation Hospital No. 50, Camp Greenleaf, Georgia, December 1918
Evacuation Hospital No. 51, Camp Greenleaf, Georgia, December 1918
Evacuation Hospital No. 52, Camp Greenleaf, Georgia, December 1918
Evacuation Hospital No. 53, Camp Greenleaf, Georgia, December 1918
Evacuation Hospital No. 54, Camp Greenleaf, Georgia, December 1918
Evacuation Hospital No. 55, Camp Greenleaf, Georgia, December 1918
Evacuation Hospital No. 56, Camp Greenleaf, Georgia, December 1918
Evacuation Hospital No. 57, Camp Greenleaf, Georgia, December 1918
Evacuation Hospital No. 58, Camp Greenleaf, Georgia, December 1918
Evacuation Hospital No. 59, Camp Greenleaf, Georgia, December 1918
Evacuation Hospital No. 60, Camp Greenleaf, Georgia, December 1918
Evacuation Hospitals No. 61 to 113 Not Organized
Evacuation Hospital No. 114, Overseas, March 1919

World War II and later
1st Evacuation Hospital, End of World War II
2nd Evacuation Hospital, End of World War II
4th Evacuation Hospital, disbanded 24 August 1942
5th Evacuation Hospital 
Camp Kilmer, New Jersey, 5 March 1946
Fort Bragg, North Carolina, reorganized and redesignated as the 5th Combat Support Hospital, 26 June 1972
6th Evacuation Hospital, disbanded 24 August 1942
7th Evacuation Hospital, End of World War II
8th Evacuation Hospital, Leghorn, Italy, 30 September 1945
9th Evacuation Hospital, End of World War II
10th Evacuation Hospital
End of World War II
Germany, 16 August 1965
Fort Meade, Maryland, reorganized and redesignated as the 10th Surgical Hospital, 16 August 1983
11th Evacuation Hospital
End of World War II
1953
12th Evacuation Hospital
Camp Kilmer, New Jersey, 6 January 1946
Fort Lewis, Washington, 15 December 1970
Germany, reorganized and redesignated as the 212th Surgical Hospital, 16 January 1992
14th Evacuation Hospital, End of World War II
15th Evacuation Hospital
Italy, 8 September 1945
Reorganized and redesignated as the 15th Combat Support Hospital, 21 December 1973
(Again reorganized and redesignated as the 15th Evacuation Hospital, 16 March 1984)
Reorganized and redesignated as the 115th Field Hospital, 16 October 1994
16th Evacuation Hospital, Italy, 31 October 1945
19th Evacuation Hospital, disbanded 25 August 1942
21st Evacuation Hospital, End of World War II
21st Evacuation Hospital,
(Redesignated from the 11th Field Hospital)
Germany, 16 August 1965
Fort Hood, Texas, reorganized and redesignated 21st Combat Support Hospital, 16 December 1992
24th Evacuation Hospital 
Rotenberg, Germany, 4 February 1946
Long Binh Post, Republic of Vietnam, 25 November 1972
25th Evacuation Hospital, End of World War II
27th Evacuation Hospital, 10 December 1945
29th Evacuation Hospital, 
End of World War II
Can Tho, Republic of Vietnam, 22 October 1969
30th Evacuation Hospital, End of World War II
32nd Evacuation Hospital, End of World War II
34th Evacuation Hospital, End of World War II
35th Evacuation Hospital, End of World War II
36th Evacuation Hospital, Vung Tau, Republic of Vietnam, 25 November 1969
38th Evacuation Hospital, Florence, Italy, 8 September 1945
39th Evacuation Hospital Camp Miles Standish, Massachusetts, 14 November 1945
41st Evacuation Hospital, End of World War II
42nd Evacuation Hospital, End of World War II
44th Evacuation Hospital, Camp Miles Standish, Massachusetts, 21 November 1945
45th Evacuation Hospital, Camp Miles Standish, Massachusetts, 21 November 1945
48th Evacuation Hospital, End of World War II
51st Evacuation Hospital, January 1946
52nd Evacuation Hospital, End of World War II
54th Evacuation Hospital, End of World War II
56th Evacuation Hospital, October 1945
58th Evacuation Hospital, End of World War II
59th Evacuation Hospital, End of World War II
65th Evacuation Hospital, End of World War II
67th Evacuation Hospital
Camp Kilmer, New Jersey, 1 January 1946
Pleiku, Republic of Vietnam, 20 March 1973
Würzburg, Germany, reorganized and redesignated 67th Combat Support Hospital, 16 July 1993
71st Evacuation Hospital
End of World War II
Fort Lewis, Washington, 15 December 1970
73rd Evacuation Hospital, End of World War II
77th Evacuation Hospital, End of World War II
86th Evacuation Hospital
Japan, 28 February 1946
Fort Campbell, Kentucky, reorganized and redesignated 86th Combat Support Hospital, 21 December 1972
(Fort Campbell, Kentucky, again reorganized and redesignated 86th Evacuation Hospital, 16 March 1984)
Fort Campbell, Kentucky, reorganized and redesignated 86th Combat Support Hospital, 16 November 1993
91st Evacuation Hospital, 
End of World War II
Fort Lewis, Washington, 28 November 1971
92nd Evacuation Hospital, Japan, February 1946
93rd Evacuation Hospital
Camp Kilmer, New Jersey, 12 December 1945
Fort Leonard Wood, Missouri, 17 July 1994
95th Evacuation Hospital 
Camp Kilmer, New Jersey, 3 December 1945
Danang, Republic of Vietnam, 9 March 1973 
96th Evacuation Hospital, Camp Patrick Henry, Virginia, 16 December 1945
97th Evacuation Hospital, Camp Miles Standish, Massachusetts, 23 November 1945
99th Evacuation Hospital, Utsunomiya, Honshu, Japan, 28 February 1946
100th Evacuation Hospital, End of World War II
101st Evacuation Hospital, End of World War II
102nd Evacuation Hospital, End of World War II
103rd Evacuation Hospital, End of World War II
103rd Evacuation Hospital, End of World War II
104th Evacuation Hospital, End of World War II
105th Evacuation Hospital
Camp Miles Standish, Massachusetts, 21 November 1945
Reorganized and redesignated as the 399th Evacuation Hospital 1 October 1953
106th Evacuation Hospital, End of World War II
107th Evacuation Hospital, End of World War II
108th Evacuation Hospital, End of World War II
109th Evacuation Hospital, End of World War II
110th Evacuation Hospital, End of World War II
111th Evacuation Hospital, End of World War II
114th Evacuation Hospital, Weilburg, Germany, 25 January 1946
116th Evacuation Hospital, End of World War II
117th Evacuation Hospital, Linz, Austria, 25 February 1946
118th Evacuation Hospital, End of World War II
119th Evacuation Hospital, End of World War II
120th Evacuation Hospital, End of World War II
121st Evacuation Hospital, End of World War II
122nd Evacuation Hospital, End of World War II
123rd Evacuation Hospital, End of World War II
124th Evacuation Hospital, End of World War II
125th Evacuation Hospital, End of World War II
126th Evacuation Hospital, End of World War II
127th Evacuation Hospital, End of World War II
128th Evacuation Hospital, Camp Kilmer, New Jersey, 12 January 1946
130th Evacuation Hospital, Camp Kilmer, New Jersey, 5 November 1945
131st Evacuation Hospital, End of World War II
132nd Evacuation Hospital, End of World War II
137th Evacuation Hospital, End of World War II
139th Evacuation Hospital, End of World War II
172nd Evacuation Hospital, End of World War II
320th Evacuation Hospital New York, New York (US Army Reserve)
343rd Evacuation Hospital Fort Hamilton, New York
361st Evacuation Hospital, End of World War II
399th Evacuation Hospital, Tauton, Massachusetts, reorganized and redesignated as the 399th Combat Support Hospital, 1 October 1974

Base hospitals
World War I
This was a specific unit designation, much like a Combat Support, MASH, or Evacuation Hospital
 Base Hospital No. 1, Camp Upton, New York, May 1919
 Base Hospital No. 2, Camp Meade, Maryland, February 1919
 Base Hospital No. 3, Camp Upton, New York, March 1919
 Base Hospital No. 4, Camp Sherman, Ohio, April 1919
 Base Hospital No. 5, Camp Devens, Massachusetts, May 1919
 Base Hospital No. 6, Camp Devens, Massachusetts, April 1919
 Base Hospital No. 7, Camp Devens, Massachusetts, April 1919
 Base Hospital No. 8, Camp Lee, Virginia, April 1919
 Base Hospital No. 9, Camp Upton, New York, May 1919
 Base Hospital No. 10, Camp Dix, New Jersey, April 1919
 Base Hospital No. 11, Camp Grant, Illinois, April 1919
 Base Hospital No. 12, Camp Grant, Illinois, April 1919 
 Base Hospital No. 13, Camp Grant, Illinois, April 1919 
 Base Hospital No. 14, Camp Grant, Illinois, May 1919 
 Base Hospital No. 15, Camp Dodge, Iowa, July 1919
 Base Hospital No. 16, Biltmore, North Carolina, April 1919
 Base Hospital No. 17, Camp Custer, Michigan, May 1919
 Base Hospital No. 18, Camp Upton, New York, 25 February 1919
 Base Hospital No. 19, Camp Upton, New York, 7 May 1919
 Base Hospital No. 20, Camp Dix, New Jersey, May 1919
 Base Hospital No. 21, Camp Funston, Kansas, May 1919
 Base Hospital No. 22, Camp Grant, Illinois, March 1919
 Base Hospital No. 23, Camp Upton, New York, May 1919
 Base Hospital No. 24, Camp Shelby, Mississippi, April 1919
 Base Hospital No. 25, Camp Zachary Taylor, Kentucky, May 1919
 Base Hospital No. 26, Camp Grant, Illinois, May 1919
 Base Hospital No. 27, Camp Dix, New Jersey, March 1919
 Base Hospital No. 28, Camp Dix, New Jersey, May 1919
 Base Hospital No. 29, Fort Logan, California, March 1919
 Base Hospital No. 30, Presidio of San Francisco, California, May 1919
 Base Hospital No. 31, Camp Dix, New Jersey, May 1919
 Base Hospital No. 32, Camp Zachary Taylor, Kentucky, May 1919
 Base Hospital No. 33, Camp Upton, New York, March 1919
 Base Hospital No. 34, Camp Dix, New Jersey, April 1919
 Base Hospital No. 35
Camp Kearny, California, 6 May 1919
Reconstituted 8 October 1936 and Consolidated with the 35th General Hospital, consolidated unit designated as the 35th General Hospital
 Base Hospital No. 36, Camp Custer, Michigan, May 1919
 Base Hospital No. 37, Camp Upton, New York, March 1919
 Base Hospital No. 38, Camp Dix, New Jersey, May 1919
 Base Hospital No. 39, Camp Devens, Massachusetts, January 1919
 Base Hospital No. 40, Camp Zachary Taylor, Kentucky, April 1919
 Base Hospital No. 41, Camp Lee, Virginia, April 1919
 Base Hospital No. 42, Camp Meade, Maryland, May 1919
 Base Hospital No. 43, Camp Gordon, Georgia, March 1919
 Base Hospital No. 44, Camp Devens, Massachusetts, May 1919
 Base Hospital No. 45, Camp Lee, Virginia, April 1919
 Base Hospital No. 46, Camp Lewis, Washington, May 1919
 Base Hospital No. 47, Presidio of San Francisco, California, May 1919
 Base Hospital No. 48, Camp Upton, New York, 7 May 1919
 Base Hospital No. 49, Camp Dodge, Iowa, May 1919
 Base Hospital No. 50
Camp Lewis, Washington, 5 May 1919
Reconstituted 19 October 1936, Consolidated with the 50th General Hospital, and the combined unit designated as the 50th General Hospital
 Base Hospital No. 51, Camp Dix, New Jersey, June 1919
 Base Hospital No. 52, Camp Sherman, Ohio, May 1919  
 Base Hospital No. 53, Camp Sherman, Ohio, July 1919
 Base Hospital No. 54, Camp Grant, Ohio, May 1919
 Base Hospital No. 55, Camp Pike, Arkansas, June 1919
 Base Hospital No. 56, Camp Dix, New Jersey, May 1919
 Base Hospital No. 57, Overseas, August 1919
 Base Hospital No. 58, Camp Dix, New Jersey, May 1919
 Base Hospital No. 59, Camp Dix, New Jersey, July 1919
 Base Hospital No. 60, Camp Sherman, Ohio, July 1919
 Base Hospital No. 61, Camp Dix, New Jersey, July 1919
 Base Hospital No. 62, Camp Dix, New Jersey, July 1919
 Base Hospital No. 63, Camp Merritt, New Jersey, April 1919
 Base Hospital No. 64, Camp Dix, New Jersey, June 1919
 Base Hospital No. 65, Camp Lee, Virginia, August 1919
 Base Hospital No. 66, Camp Devens, Massachusetts, February 1919
 Base Hospital No. 67, Camp Dix, New Jersey and Camp Sherman, Ohio, May 1919
 Base Hospital No. 68, Camp Dix, New Jersey and Camp Sherman, Ohio, May 1919
 Base Hospital No. 69, Camp Grant, Illinois, July 1919
 Base Hospital No. 70, Camp Pike, Arkansas, May 1919
 Base Hospital No. 71, Camp Shelby, Mississippi, May 1919
 Base Hospital No. 72, Camp Dix, New Jersey, May 1919
 Base Hospital No. 73, Camp Greenleaf, Georgia, December 1918
 Base Hospital No. 74, Camp Greenleaf, Georgia, December 1918
 Base Hospital No. 75, Camp Greenleaf, Georgia, December 1918
 Base Hospital No. 76, Camp Dix, New Jersey, May 1919
 Base Hospital No. 77, Camp Upton, New York, May 1919
 Base Hospital No. 78, Camp Dix, New Jersey, June 1919
 Base Hospital No. 79, Camp Upton, New York, July 1919
 Base Hospital No. 80, Camp Upton, New York, May 1919
 Base Hospital No. 81, Camp Dodge, Iowa, June 1919
 Base Hospital No. 82, Camp Devens, Massachusetts, June 1919
 Base Hospital No. 83, Camp Dix, New Jersey,  May 1919 
 Base Hospital No. 84, Camp Bowie, Texas, July 1919
 Base Hospital No. 85, Camp Upton, New York, July 1919 
 Base Hospital No. 86, Camp Dix, New Jersey, May 1919 
 Base Hospital No. 87, Camp Funston, Kansas, June 1919
 Base Hospital No. 88, Camp Dodge, Iowa, July 1919 
 Base Hospital No. 89, Camp Dix, New Jersey, July 1919 
 Base Hospital No. 90, Camp Custer, Michigan, July 1919 
 Base Hospital No. 91, Camp Upton, New York, August 1919
 Base Hospital No. 92, Camp Upton, New York, April 1919
 Base Hospital No. 93, Camp Lewis, Washington, June 1919
 Base Hospital No. 94, Camp Bowie, Texas, April 1919
 Base Hospital No. 95, Fort D. A. Russell, Wyoming, July 1919 
 Base Hospital No. 96, Presidio of San Francisco, California, May 1919
 Base Hospital No. 97, Camp Dix, New Jersey, April 1919
 Base Hospital No. 98, Camp Dix, New Jersey, June 1919
 Base Hospital No. 99, Camp Custer, Michigan, June 1919
 Base Hospital No. 100, Camp Sherman, Ohio, July 1919
 Base Hospital No. 101, Camp Dix, New Jersey, July 1919
 Base Hospital No. 102, Camp Shelby, Mississippi, May 1919
 Base Hospital No. 103, Camp Funston, Kansas, July 1919
 Base Hospital No. 104, Camp Dix, New Jersey, July 1919
 Base Hospital No. 105, Camp Dix, New Jersey, April 1919
 Base Hospital No. 106, Camp Dix, New Jersey, July 1919
 Base Hospital No. 107, Camp Pike, Arkansas, July 1919
 Base Hospital No. 108, Camp Dodge, Iowa, July 1919
 Base Hospital No. 109, Camp Dodge, Iowa, May 1919
 Base Hospital No. 110, Camp Dix, New Jersey, July 1919
 Base Hospital No. 111, Camp Dix, New Jersey, June 1919
 Base Hospital No. 112, Camp Dix, New Jersey, April 1919
 Base Hospital No. 113, Camp Dix, New Jersey, August 1919
 Base Hospital No. 114, Camp Meade, Maryland, May 1919
 Base Hospital No. 115, Camp Dix, New Jersey, May 1919
 Base Hospital No. 116, Camp Upton, New York, May 1919
 Base Hospital No. 117, Overseas, January 1919
 Base Hospital No. 118, Camp Zachary Taylor, Kentucky, July 1919
 Base Hospital No. 119, Camp Zachary Taylor, Kentucky, July 1919
 Base Hospital No. 120, Camp Dodge, Iowa, July 1919
 Base Hospital No. 121, Camp Dodge, Iowa, July 1919
 Base Hospital No. 122, Camp Greene, North Carolina,
 Base Hospital No. 123, Camp Pike, Arkansas, July 1919
 Base Hospital No. 124, Camp Hancock, Georgia, January 1919
 Base Hospital No. 125, Camp Hancock, Georgia, January 1919
 Base Hospital No. 126, Camp McClellan, Alabama, December 1918
 Base Hospital No. 127, Camp McClellan, Alabama, December 1918
 Base Hospital No. 128, Camp Sevier, South Carolina, December 1918
 Base Hospital No. 129, Camp Shelby, Mississippi, December 1918
 Base Hospital No. 130, Camp Shelby, Mississippi, December 1918
 Base Hospital No. 131, Camp Zachary Taylor, Kentucky, June 1919
 Base Hospital No. 132, Camp Sheridan, Alabama, December 1918
 Base Hospital No. 133, Camp Sheridan, Alabama, December 1918
 Base Hospital No. 134, Camp Wadsworth, South Carolina, January 1919
 Base Hospital No. 135, Camp Wadsworth, South Carolina, January 1919
 Base Hospital No. 136, Camp Upton, New York, July 1919
 Base Hospital No. 137, Camp Wheeler, Georgia, December 1918
 Base Hospital No. 138, Fort Ontario, New York, December 1918
 Base Hospital No. 139, Camp May, New Jersey, December 1918
 Base Hospital No. 140, Camp Joseph E. Johnson, Florida, December 1918
 Base Hospital No. 141, Fort Ethan Allen, Vermont, December 1918
 Base Hospital No. 142, Fort Sheridan, Illinois, December 1918
 Base Hospital No. 143, Fort Sheridan, Illinois, December 1918
 Base Hospital No. 144, Camp Dodge, Iowa, December 1918
 Base Hospital No. 145, Fort Benjamin Harrison, Indiana, December 1918
 Base Hospital No. 146, Camp Jackson, South Carolina, December 1918
 Base Hospital No. 147, Camp Greene, North Carolina, December 1918
 Base Hospital No. 148, Camp Sevier, South Carolina, December 1918
 Base Hospital No. 149, Camp Sherman, Ohio, December 1918
 Base Hospital No. 150, Camp Travis, Texas, December 1918
 Base Hospital No. 151, Camp Greenleaf, Georgia, December 1918
 Base Hospital No. 152, Camp Greenleaf, Georgia, December 1918
 Base Hospital No. 153, Camp Greenleaf, Georgia, December 1918
 Base Hospital No. 154, Camp Greenleaf, Georgia, December 1918
 Base Hospital No. 155, Camp Greenleaf, Georgia, December 1918
 Base Hospital No. 156, Camp Greenleaf, Georgia, December 1918
 Base Hospital No. 157, Camp Greenleaf, Georgia, December 1918
 Base Hospital No. 158, Camp Greenleaf, Georgia, December 1918
 Base Hospital No. 159, Camp Greenleaf, Georgia, December 1918
 Base Hospital No. 160, Camp Greenleaf, Georgia, December 1918
 Base Hospital No. 161, Camp Greenleaf, Georgia, December 1918
 Base Hospital No. 162, Camp Lewis, Washington, December 1918
 Base Hospital No. 163, Camp Bowie, Texas, December 1918
 Base Hospital No. 164, Camp Logan, Texas, January 1919
 Base Hospital No. 165, Camp MacArthur, Texas, January 1919 
 Base Hospitals No. 166 through 201, Never Organized
 Base Hospital No. 202, Camp Dix, New Jersey, April 1919
 Base Hospital No. 203, Never Organized
 Base Hospital No. 204, Overseas, January 1919
 Base Hospital No. 205 through 207, Never Organized
 Base Hospital No. 208, Camp Dix, New Jersey, June 1919
 Base Hospital No. 209, Never Organized
 Base Hospital No. 210, Presidio of San Francisco, California, June 1919
 Base Hospitals No. 211 through 213, Never Organized
 Base Hospital No. 214, Camp Dix, New Jersey, July 1919
 Base Hospital No. 215, Never Organized
 Base Hospital No. 216, New Jersey, July 1919
 Base Hospital No. 217, Never Organized
 Base Hospital No. 218, See Camp Hospital No. 61
 Base Hospitals No. 219 through 221, Never Organized
 Base Hospital No. 222, Overseas, November 1918
 Base Hospital No. 223, Never Organized 
 Base Hospital No. 224, Overseas, November 1918
 Base Hospitals No. 225 through 227, Never Organized
 Base Hospital No. 228, Overseas, November 1918
 Base Hospital No. 229, Never Organized
 Base Hospital No. 230, Overseas, November 1918
 Base Hospitals No. 231 through 233, Never Organized
 Base Hospital No. 234, Overseas, November 1918
 Base Hospital No. 235, Never Organized
 Base Hospital No. 236, See Camp Hospital No. 92
 Base Hospital No. 237, Never Organized
 Base Hospital No. 238, Overseas, February 1919

Camp hospitals
World War I
This was a specific unit designation, much like a Combat Support, MASH, or Evacuation Hospital
Camp Hospital No. 1, Camp Dix, New Jersey, June 1919
Camp Hospital No. 2, Camp Jackson, South Carolina, July 1919
Camp Hospital No. 3, Camp Devens, Massachusetts, June 1919
Camp Hospital No. 4, Camp Sherman, Ohio, July 1919
Camp Hospital No. 5, Fort Upton, New York, July 1919
Camp Hospital No. 6, Camp Dodge, Iowa, July 1919
Camp Hospital No. 7, France, March 1919
Camp Hospital No. 8, Camp Sherman, Ohio, June 1919
Camp Hospital No. 9, Camp Sherman, Ohio, June 1919
Camp Hospital No. 10, France, March 1919
Camp Hospital No. 11, Camp Sherman, Ohio,
Camp Hospital No. 12, Camp Gordon, Georgia,
Camp Hospital No. 13, France, December 1918
Camp Hospital No. 14, Camp Dodge, Iowa, June 1919
Camp Hospital No. 15, Camp Dodge, Iowa,
Camp Hospital No. 16, Not Organized
Camp Hospital No. 17, Not Organized 
Camp Hospital No. 18, France, August 1918
Camp Hospital No. 19, Camp A. P. Hill, Virginia, July 1919
Camp Hospital No. 20, France, May 1919
Camp Hospital No. 21, Camp Dix, New Jersey, June 1919
Camp Hospital No. 22, France, February 1919
Camp Hospital No. 23, France, August 1918
Camp Hospital No. 24, France, April 1918
Camp Hospital No. 25, Camp Upton, New York, June 1919
Camp Hospital No. 26, Camp Upton, New York, June 1919
Camp Hospital No. 27, Camp Dix, New Jersey, August 1919
Camp Hospital No. 28, Camp Dix, New Jersey, July 1919
Camp Hospital No. 29, France, March 1919
Camp Hospital No. 30, France, January 1919
Camp Hospital No. 31, France, April 1919
Camp Hospital No. 32, Not Organized
Camp Hospital No. 33
Camp Hospital No. 34, France, February 1919
Camp Hospital No. 35, France, February 1919
Camp Hospital No. 36, France, November 1918
Camp Hospital No. 37, France, February 1919
Camp Hospital No. 38, France, April 1919
Camp Hospital No. 39, Camp Dix, New Jersey, June 1919
Camp Hospital No. 40, Camp Grant, Illinois, May 1919
Camp Hospital No. 41, Camp Devens, Massachusetts, July 1919
Camp Hospital No. 42, Camp Dodge, Iowa, June 1919
Camp Hospital No. 43, France, September 1919
Camp Hospital No. 44, France, December 1918
Camp Hospital No. 45, Camp Grant, Illinois, July 1919
Camp Hospital No. 46, France, February 1919
Camp Hospital No. 47, redesignated Base Hospital No. 208, November 1918
Camp Hospital No. 48, Camp Dodge, Iowa, July 1919
Camp Hospital No. 49, Camp Devens, Massachusetts, June 1919
Camp Hospital No. 50, Camp Upton, New York, July 1919
Camp Hospital No. 51, France, December 1918
Camp Hospital No. 52, Camp Gordon, Georgia, July 1919
Camp Hospital No. 53, Camp Zachary Taylor, Kentucky, July 1919
Camp Hospital No. 54, France, reorganized and redesignated Camp Hospital No. 78, October 1918
Camp Hospital No. 55, France, May 1919
Camp Hospital No. 56, France, January 1919
Camp Hospital No. 57, France, January 1919
Camp Hospital No. 58, Not Organized
Camp Hospital No. 59, France, March 1919
Camp Hospital No. 60, France, December 1918
Camp Hospital No. 61, Camp Upton, New York, July 1919 
Camp Hospital No. 62, France, November 1918
Camp Hospital No. 63, Not Organized
Camp Hospital No. 64, Camp Dix, New Jersey, June 1919
Camp Hospital No. 65, Camp Grant, Illinois, June 1919
Camp Hospital No. 66, Camp Upton, New York, July 1919
Camp Hospital No. 67, France, April 1919
Camp Hospital No. 68, Camp Devens, Massachusetts, July 1919
Camp Hospital No. 69, France, December 1918
Camp Hospital No. 70, France, February 1919
Camp Hospital No. 71, France, October 1918
Camp Hospital No. 72, Camp Upton, New York, July 1919
Camp Hospital No. 73, France, January 1919
Camp Hospital No. 74, Not Organized
Camp Hospital No. 75, France, January 1919
Camp Hospital No. 76, Camp Mills, New York, July 1919 
Camp Hospital No. 77, France, November 1918
Camp Hospital No. 78, France, December 1918
Camp Hospital No. 79, France, May 1919
Camp Hospital No. 80, Not Organized
Camp Hospital No. 81, Not Organized
Camp Hospital No. 82, France, April 1919
Camp Hospital No. 83, Not Organized
Camp Hospital No. 84, Not Organized
Camp Hospital No. 85, Camp Upton, New York, July 1919
Camp Hospital No. 86, France, November 1918
Camp Hospital No. 87, France, February 1919
Camp Hospital No. 88, France, December 1918
Camp Hospital No. 89, Not Organized
Camp Hospital No. 90, Not Organized
Camp Hospital No. 91, France, April 1919
Camp Hospital No. 92, France, January 1919
Camp Hospital No. 93, Camp Devens, Massachusetts, June 1919
Camp Hospital No. 94, France, April 1919
Camp Hospital No. 95, France, June 1919
Camp Hospital No. 96, France, January 1919
Camp Hospital No. 97, Camp Upton, New York, July 1919
Camp Hospital No. 98, Not Organized
Camp Hospital No. 99, Not Organized
Camp Hospital No. 100, France, January 1919
Camp Hospital No. 101, Camp Dix, New Jersey, July 1919
Camp Hospital No. 102, France, May 1919
Camp Hospital No. 103, Camp Dix, New Jersey, June 1919
Camp Hospital No. 104, France, May 1919
Camp Hospital No. 105, France, May 1919
Camp Hospital No. 106, France, May 1919
Camp Hospital No. 107, Camp Upton, New York, July 1919
Camp Hospital No. 108, Camp Bowie, Texas, July 1919
Camp Hospital No. 109, Camp Jackson, South Carolina, July 1919
Camp Hospital No. 110, Camp Gordon, Georgia, July 1919
Camp Hospital No. 111, Camp Upton, New York, June 1919
Camp Hospital No. 112, Camp Gordon, Georgia, July 1919
Camp Hospital No. 113, Not Organized
Camp Hospital No. 114, Camp Upton, New York, July 1919
Camp Hospital No. 115, Camp Dix, New Jersey, July 1919
Camp Hospital No. 116, Not Organized
Camp Hospital No. 117, France, June 1919
Camp Hospital No. 118, France, August 1919
Camp Hospital No. 119, Camp Devens, Massachusetts, July 1919
Camp Hospital No. 120, Camp Gordon, Georgia, July 1919
Camp Hospital No. 121, Consolidated with American Red Cross Military Hospital No. 3, June 1919
Camp Hospital No. 122, Camp Devens, Massachusetts, August 1919

Convalescent hospitals/centers

2nd Convalescent Hospital
3rd Convalescent Hospital, Italy, 8 September 1945
4th Convalescent Hospital (1945)
6th Convalescent Center
New York Port of Embarkation, 4 November 1945
Germany, 20 September 1958
Cam Rahn Bay, Republic of Vietnam, 30 October 1971
7th Convalescent Hospital (1945) 
8th Convalescent Hospital

Debarkation hospitals
World War I
This was a specific unit designation, much like a Combat Support, MASH, or Evacuation Hospital
Debarkation Hospital No. 1, Ellis Island, New York, June 1919
Debarkation Hospital No. 2, Fox Hills, Staten Island, New York, See General Hospital No. 41 
Debarkation Hospital No. 3, Greenhut Building, New York, New York, July 1919
Debarkation Hospital No. 4, Nassau Hotel, Long Beach, Long Island, New York, July 1919
Debarkation Hospital No. 5, Grand Central Palace, New York, New York, June 1919
Debarkation Hospital No. 51, Hampton, Virginia, See General Hospital No. 39
Debarkation Hospital No. 52, Richmond College, Virginia, April 1919

Embarkation hospitals
World War I
This was a specific unit designation, much like a Combat Support, MASH, or Evacuation Hospital
Embarkation Hospital No. 1, St. Mary's Hospital, Hoboken, New Jersey, October 1919
Embarkation Hospital No. 2, Secaucus, New Jersey, February 1919
Embarkation Hospital No. 3, Hoffman Island, New York Harbor, New York, August 1919
Embarkation Hospital No. 4, Polyclinic Hospital, New York, New York, August 1919

Field hospitals

World War I
Field Hospital (non-divisional) Nos. 1-5 Not Organized 
Field Hospital (non-divisional) No. 6, January 1919
Field Hospital (non-divisional) No. 7-9 Not Organized
Field Hospital (non-divisional) No. 10, December 1919
Field Hospital (non-divisional) No. 11-13 Not Organized
Field Hospital (non-divisional) No. 14, January 1919
Field Hospital (non-divisional) No. 15-17 Not Organized
Field Hospital (non-divisional) No. 18, December 1918
Field Hospital (non-divisional) No. 19-23 Not Organized
Field Hospital (non-divisional) No. 24, July 1919
Field Hospital (non-divisional) No. 25-38 Not Organized
Field Hospital (non-divisional) No. 39, July 1919
Field Hospital (non-divisional) No. 40, Not Organized
Field Hospital (non-divisional) No. 41, April 1919
Field Hospital (non-divisional) No. 42, April 1919
Field Hospital (non-divisional) No. 43, Not Organized
Field Hospital (non-divisional) No. 44, August 19919
Field Hospital (non-divisional) No. 45-62 Not Organized
Field Hospital (non-divisional) No. 63, December 1918
Field Hospital (non-divisional) No. 64, December 1918
Field Hospital (non-divisional) No. 65, December 1918
Field Hospital (non-divisional) No. 66, December 1918

World War II and later
4th Field Hospital, Italy, 10 September 1945
10th Field Hospital
Camp Miles Standish, Massachusetts, 4 November 1945
Reorganized and redesignated as the 10th Evacuation Hospital, 15 June 1962 
11th Field Hospital
Camp Myles Standish, Massachusetts, 21 November 1945
Germany, reorganized and redesignated 21st Evacuation Hospital, 15 June 1962
14th Field Hospital
Germany, 25 March 1946
Korea, 1 February 1954
Germany, 15 April 1968
Fort Benning, Georgia, reorganized and redesignated 14th Combat Support Hospital, 17 October 2004
15th Field Hospital, Italy, 13 May 1946
19th Field Hospital, Iran
1st & 2nd Platoons, 31 July 1945
3rd Platoon, 8 September 1945
33rd Field Hospital, Italy, 25 September 1945
35th Field Hospital, Italy, 25 October 1945
42nd Field Hospital, Fort Knox, Kentucky
47th Field Hospital
Germany, 15 November 1945
Fort Sill, Oklahoma
51st Field Hospital

74th Field Hospital Bronx, New York / Orangeburg, New York  (US Army Reserve)  (First USAR Hospital mobilized for service in Vietnam)
92nd Field Hospital, Japan, 28 February 1946
99th Field Hospital, Italy, 1 May 1946
115th Field Hospital, Fort Polk, Louisiana, reorganized and redesignated as the 115th Combat Support Hospital, 16 October 2005
131st Field Hospital, Fort Bliss, Texas, reorganized and redesignated as the 31st Combat Support Hospital, 16 February 1996
301st Field Hospital, La Chapelle-Saint-Mesmin, France
325th Field Hospital, reorganized and redesignated as the 325th Combat Support Hospital, 1 October 2006

Gas hospitals

World War I
This was a specific unit designation, much like a Combat Support, MASH, or Evacuation Hospital
Gas Hospital No. 1, France, November 1918
Gas Hospital No. 2, France, November 1918 
Gas Hospital No. 3, France, November 1918
Gas Hospital No. 4, France, November 1918

Mobile Army Surgical Hospitals
The Army's official designation for the MASH is Surgical Hospital (Mobile) (Army). In official correspondence, troop lists, etc. they would often be referred to as the XXth Surgical Hospital through the end of the Vietnam War (and the start of the TV series M*A*S*H)

2nd Surgical Hospital, Lai Khe, Republic of Vietnam, March 10, 1970
3rd Surgical Hospital, Fort Lewis, Washington, 1972.
4th Surgical Hospital, Anniston Alabama 1974
5th Surgical Hospital, Fort Bragg, NC (~1997)
7th Surgical Hospital, Republic of Vietnam, July 10, 1970
10th Surgical Hospital, Fort Carson, Colorado, reorganized and redesignated as the 10th Combat Support Hospital, 16 December 1992 
18th Surgical Hospital, Quang Tri, Republic of Vietnam, August 30, 1971
22nd Surgical Hospital, Phu Bai, Republic of Vietnam, October 18, 1969
27th Surgical Hospital, Chu Lai, Republic of Vietnam, June 13, 1971
28th Surgical Hospital, Fort Bragg, North Carolina, reorganized and redesignated as the 28th Combat Support Hospital, 21 December 1972
31st Surgical Hospital, Germany, reorganized and redesignated as the 31st Combat Support Hospital, 21 November 1973
41st Surgical Hospital, Fort Sam Houston, Texas, reorganized and redesignated as the 41st Combat Support Hospital, 26 June 1972
45th Surgical Hospital, Republic of Vietnam, December 10, 1970
46th Surgical Hospital, Korea, (1951?-1954)
47th Surgical Hospital
Fort Riley, Kansas, 15 November 1953
Fort Lewis, Washington, reorganized and redesignated as the 47th Combat Support Hospital, 21 May 1973
48th Surgical Hospital, reorganized and redesignated as the 128th Evacuation Hospital, 1 May 1943
61st Surgical Hospital, Fort Meade, Maryland, reorganized and redesignated as the 93rd Evacuation Hospital, 19 August 1942
116th Surgical Hospital, Delaware Army National Guard, Wilmington, DE
131st Surgical Hospital, Florida Army National Guard Temple Terrace, FL
135th Surgical Hospital, Missouri Army National Guard, Kansas City, MO 1995 
159th Surgical Hospital, Louisiana Army National Guard, New Orleans, LA
212th Surgical Hospital, Germany, reorganized and redesignated as the 212th Combat Support Hospital, 16 October 2006
914th Surgical Hospital
Dublin, Georgia, 1 February 1951
Redesignated 17 September 1993 as the 934th Combat Support Hospital
8076th Surgical Hospital

Mobile hospitals

World War I
This was a specific unit designation, much like a Combat Support, MASH, or Evacuation Hospital
Mobile Hospital No. 1, May 1919 in the United States
Mobile Hospital No. 2, December 1918 in France
Mobile Hospital No. 3, June 1919 in France
Mobile Hospital No. 4, January 1919 in France
Mobile Hospital No. 5, January 1919 in France
Mobile Hospital No. 6, January 1919 in France
Mobile Hospital No. 7, June 1919 in the United States
Mobile Hospital No. 8, January 1919 in France
Mobile Hospital No. 9, April 1919 in France
Mobile Hospital No. 10, June 1919 in the United States
Mobile Hospital No. 11, June 1919 in the United States
Mobile Hospital No. 12, April 1919 in France
Mobile Hospitals Number 13 through 38 Never Organized
Mobile Hospital No. 39, See Base Hospital 39 
Mobile Hospitals Number 40 through 99 Never Organized
Mobile Hospital No. 100, March 1919
Mobile Hospital No. 101, March 1919
Mobile Hospital No. 102, March 1919
Mobile Hospital No. 103, March 1919
Mobile Hospital No. 104, March 1919
Mobile Hospital No. 105, March 1919
Mobile Hospital No. 106, December 1918
Mobile Hospital No. 107, December 1918
Mobile Hospital No. 108, January 1919
Mobile Hospital No. 109, December 1918

Portable Surgical Hospitals
1st Portable Surgical Hospital, End of World War II Pacific Theater
2nd Portable Surgical Hospital, End of World War II Pacific Theater
3rd Portable Surgical Hospital, Manila, Philippine Islands, 11 December 1945
4th Portable Surgical Hospital, End of World War II Pacific Theater
5th Portable Surgical Hospital, End of World War II Pacific Theater
6th Portable Surgical Hospital, End of World War II Pacific Theater
7th Portable Surgical Hospital, End of World War II Pacific Theater
8th Portable Surgical Hospital, End of World War II Pacific Theater
9th Portable Surgical Hospital, End of World War II Pacific Theater
10th Portable Surgical Hospital, End of World War II Pacific Theater
11th Portable Surgical Hospital, End of World War II Pacific Theater
12th Portable Surgical Hospital, End of World War II Pacific Theater
13th Portable Surgical Hospital, End of World War II Pacific Theater
14th Portable Surgical Hospital, End of World War II Pacific Theater
15th Portable Surgical Hospital, End of World War II Pacific Theater
16th Portable Surgical Hospital, End of World War II Pacific Theater
17th Portable Surgical Hospital, End of World War II Pacific Theater
18th Portable Surgical Hospital
Japan, 1 December 1945
Redesignated 1 March 1963 as the 18th Surgical Hospital
19th Portable Surgical Hospital, End of World War II Pacific Theater
20th Portable Surgical Hospital, End of World War II Pacific Theater
21st Portable Surgical Hospital, End of World War II Pacific Theater
22nd Portable Surgical Hospital, End of World War II Pacific Theater
23rd Portable Surgical Hospital, End of World War II Pacific Theater
24th Portable Surgical Hospital, End of World War II Pacific Theater
27th Portable Surgical Hospital, End of World War II Pacific Theater
28th Portable Surgical Hospital
India, 20 December 1945
Redesignated as the 28th Surgical Hospital, 18 April 1967
30th Portable Surgical Hospital
Japan, 31 October 1945
Redesignated as the 228th Combat Support Hospital, 1 August 1996
31st Portable Surgical Hospital
Lingayen, Philippines, 5 November 1945
Redesignated as the 31st Surgical Hospital (Mobile) (Army), 16 February 1951
32nd Portable Surgical Hospital, India, 23 December 1945
33rd Portable Surgical Hospital, End of World War II Pacific Theater
34th Portable Surgical Hospital, End of World War II Pacific Theater
35th Portable Surgical Hospital, End of World War II Pacific Theater
36th Portable Surgical Hospital, End of World War II Pacific Theater
38th Portable Surgical Hospital, End of World War II Pacific Theater
40th Portable Surgical Hospital, End of World War II Pacific Theater
41st Portable Surgical Hospital
Philippine Islands, 31 October 1945
Redesignated as the 41st Surgical Hospital, 28 November 1967
44th Portable Surgical Hospital Portable Surgical Hospital, End of World War II Pacific Theater
45th Portable Surgical Hospital, End of World War II Pacific Theater
46th Portable Surgical Hospital, End of World War II Pacific Theater
47th Portable Surgical Hospital
Camp Kilmer, New Jersey, 3 November 1945
Redesignated as the 47th Surgical Hospital, 24 November 1952
48th Portable Surgical Hospital, End of World War II Pacific Theater
49th Portable Surgical Hospital, End of World War II Pacific Theater 
50th Portable Surgical Hospital, End of World War II Pacific Theater
51st Portable Surgical Hospital, End of World War II Pacific Theater
52nd Portable Surgical Hospital, End of World War II Pacific Theater
53rd Portable Surgical Hospital, End of World War II Pacific Theater
54th Portable Surgical Hospital
Camp Stoneman, California 25 February 1948
Redesignated 5 October 1948 as the 914th Surgical Hospital
56th Portable Surgical Hospital, End of World War II Pacific Theater
57th Portable Surgical Hospital, End of World War II Pacific Theater
58th Portable Surgical Hospital, End of World War II Pacific Theater
60th Portable Surgical Hospital, End of World War II Pacific Theater
61st Portable Surgical Hospital, End of World War II Pacific Theater
62nd Portable Surgical Hospital, End of World War II Pacific Theater
63rd Portable Surgical Hospital, End of World War II Pacific Theater
64th Portable Surgical Hospital, End of World War II Pacific Theater
66th Portable Surgical Hospital, End of World War II Pacific Theater
67th Portable Surgical Hospital, End of World War II Pacific Theater
95th Portable Surgical Hospital, End of World War II Pacific Theater
96th Portable Surgical Hospital, End of World War II Pacific Theater
97th Portable Surgical Hospital, End of World War II Pacific Theater
98th Portable Surgical Hospital, End of World War II Pacific Theater

Station hospitals
7th Station Hospital 
 Italy, 15 September 1945
 (Reactivated 1 May 1947)
9th Station Hospital, Salzburg, Austria (1949-1951)
11th Station Hospital, Iceland, Combined with 72nd Station Hospital and combined unit redesignated 366th Station Hospital, 6 December 1943
14th Station Hospital, Iceland, Combined with 15th and 167th Station Hospitals and combined unit redesignated 365th Station Hospital, 6 December 1943
15th Station Hospital, Iceland, Combined with 14th and 167th Station Hospitals and combined unit redesignated 365th Station Hospital, 6 December 1943
19th Station Hospital, Iran, 27 December 1945
20th Station Hospital, Nurnberg, Germany (1961-1967)
25th Station Hospital, Roberts Field, Liberia, 15 February 1946
28th Station Hospital
Camp Kilmer, New Jersey, 2 January 1946
Redesignated 4 September 1947 as the 801st Station Hospital
29th Station Hospital, Algiers, Algeria, reorganized and redesignated 170th Evacuation Hospital, 5 November 1944
33rd Station Hospital, Fontainebleau, France
34th Station Hospital, Italy, 9 October 1947
43rd Station Hospital, Italy, 5 June 1944
50th Station Hospital, Italy, reorganized and redesignated 99th Field Hospital, 20 March 1945
53rd Station Hospital
Inactivated 5 June 1944
(Reactivated 16 August 1945)
Inactivated 10 December 1945
54th Station Hospital, Oran, Algeria, reorganized and redesignated as the 171st Evacuation Hospital 20 March 1945
55th Station Hospital, Italy, 22 April 1947
56th Station Hospital, Heliopolis, Egypt, inactivated 15 March 1946 but closed in May 1946
57th Station Hospital, redesignated 247th Medical Detachment 1 March 1945
58th Station Hospital, Caserta, Italy, 5 June 1944
60th Station Hospital, Chinon, France
61st Station Hospital, Leghorn, Italy, 15 November 1947
64th Station Hospital, Dugenta, Italy, 5 June 1944
67th Station Hospital, Accra, Gold Coast, 31 July 1945
72nd Station Hospital, Kaldadharnes, Iceland, Combined with 11th Station Hospital and Redesignated 366th Station Hospital 6 December 1943
75th Station Hospital, Bad Cannstatt, Germany
79th Station Hospital, Algiers, Algeria, 24 August 1944
92nd Station Hospital, Keflavik, Iceland, 1 January 1946
93rd Station Hospital, Tripoli, 28 October 1945
104th Station Hospital, Khartoum, Sudan, disbanded 31 July 1945
110th Station Hospital, Vienna, Austria
113th Station Hospital, Ahwaz, Iran, redesignated 113th General Hospital, 7 September 1943
124th Station Hospital, Linz, Austria
130th Station Hospital, Heidelberg, Germany 15 November 1994 
151st Station Hospital, La Senia, Algeria, 5 June 1944
154th Station Hospital, Italy, 1 October 1945
167th Station Hospital, Iceland, Combined with 14th and 15th Station Hospitals and Redesignated 365th Station Hospital 6 December 1943
172nd Station Hospital, Indooroopilly, Brisbane Queensland Australia, 1942 to 1945
175th Station Hospital, Ascension Island, 30 September 1945
188th Station Hospital, Narsarssuak, Greenland, 31 December 1945
189th Station Hospital, Ivigtut, Greenland, 11 December 1944
190th Station Hospital, Greenland, 30 September 1945
191st Station Hospital, Angmagssalik, Greenland, disbanded 10 July 1945
192nd Station Hospital, Iceland, 24 June 1943
193rd Station Hospital, Belem, Brazil, 30 September 1945
194th Station Hospital, Natal, Brazil, 5 October 1945
196th Station Hospital, Paris, France (1955-?)
200th Station Hospital, Recife, Brazil, 12 October 1945
221st Station Hospital, Fort Bell, Hamilton Parish, Bermuda, 1 January 1946
255th Station Hospital, Port-of-Spain, Trinidad, disbanded 1 May 1944
256th Station Hospital, Iran, 10 December 1945
279th Station Hospital, Berlin, Germany (1989)
292nd Station Hospital, Aversa, Italy, 15 January 1947
293rd Station Hospital, Fort Byham—Coolidge Field, Antigua, disbanded 1 November 1944
294th Station Hospital, St. Thomas, Virgin Islands, disbanded 1 April 1944
295th Station Hospital, Henry Barracks, Puerto Rico, disbanded 1 April 1944
296th Station Hospital, Camp Tortuguero, Puerto Rico, 3 June 1946
297th Station Hospital, Fort Buchanan, Puerto Rico, disbanded 1 May 1944
298th Station Hospital, San Juan, Puerto Rico, redesignated 161st General Hospital, 1 June 1944
299th Station Hospital, San Julian, Cuba, redesignated 299th Medical Dispensary, 3 June 1946
300th Station Hospital, Batista Field, Cuba, 1 February 1947
308th Station Hospital, Fort Pepperrell, St. John's, Newfoundland, 1 January 1946
309th Station Hospital, Fort McAndrew, Argentia, Newfoundland, disbanded 8 September 1945
319th Station Hospital, Bremerhaven, Germany
326th Station Hospital, Camp O'Reilly, Gurabo, Puerto Rico, 27 March 1950
330th Station Hospital, Borinquen Field, Puerto Rico, 31 March 1949
333rd Station Hospital, Fort Clayton, Canal Zone, redesignated 262nd General Hospital 1 April 1944
348th Station Hospital, Bremerhaven, Germany (1945-1969)
352nd Station Hospital, Zanderij Field, Surinam, 3 June 1946
353rd Station Hospital, Atkinson Field, British Guiana, 15 January 1947
354th Station Hospital, Paramaribo, Surinam, disbanded 1 November 1944
355th Station Hospital, Vieux Fort, St. Lucia, disbanded 1 November 1944
356th Station Hospital, Camp Suffisant, Curaçao, disbanded 22 August 1945
358th Station Hospital, Camp Savaneta, Aruba, disbanded 22 August 1945
359th Station Hospital, Fort Read, Trinidad, 31 March 1947
366th Station Hospital, Reykjavik, Iceland, 23 March 1945
367th Station Hospital, reorganized and redesignated 338th Medical Detachment, 1 January 1946
368th Station Hospital, Fort Gullickson, Canal Zone, 22 November 1948
370th Station Hospital, Marrakech, French Morocco, 25 October 1945
384th Station Hospital, Casablanca, French Morocco, 10 March 1946
385th Station Hospital, Nurnberg, Germany (1946-1949)
387th Station Hospital, Bad Cannstatt, Germany
391st Station Hospital, Udine, Italy, 15 October 1947
392nd Station Hospital, Naples, Italy, 15 January 1947
801st Station Hospital, Fort Sheridan, Illinois, reorganized and redesignated as the 801st Combat Support Hospital, 1 September 1995

Army Reserve expansion hospitals
1125th U.S. Army Hospital at Auburn, Maine, supporting Fort Devens, Massachusetts (2014)
1207th U.S. Army Hospital at Fort Benning, Georgia (2014)
1208th U.S. Army Hospital at Fort Hamilton, New York, supporting Patterson Army Hospital, Fort Monmouth, New Jersey (2014)
2289th U.S. Army Hospital at Wilmington, Delaware, supporting Walson Army Hospital, Fort Dix, New Jersey (2014)
2290th U.S. Army Hospital at Walter Reed Army Medical Center, Washington, DC (2014)
2291st U.S. Army Hospital at Fort Lee, Virginia (2014)
3270th U.S. Army Hospital at Fort Jackson, South Carolina (2014)
3271st U.S. Army Hospital at Fort Stewart, Georgia (2014)
3273rd U.S. Army Hospital at Fort Campbell, Kentucky (2014)
3297th U.S. Army Hospital at Fort Gordon, Georgia (2014)
3274th U.S. Army Hospital at Fort Bragg, North Carolina (2014)
3343rd U.S. Army Hospital at Mobile, Alabama supporting Redstone Arsenal (2014)
3344th U.S. Army Hospital at Tampa, Florida, supporting Fort Rucker, Alabama (2014)
3345th U.S. Army Hospital at Birmingham, Alabama, supporting Fort McClellan (2014)
4005th U.S. Army Hospital at Fort Hood, Texas (2014)
4010th U.S. Army Hospital at New Orleans, Louisiana, supporting Bayne-Jones Army Community Hospital, Fort Polk, Louisiana (2014)
5010th U.S. Army Hospital at Louisville, Kentucky then at Fort Gordon, Georgia (2014)
5501st U.S. Army Hospital at Fort Snelling, Minnesota, then at Fort Sam Houston, Texas (2014)
5502nd U.S. Army Hospital at Aurora, Colorado (2014)
5503rd U.S. Army Hospital at Columbia, Missouri (2014)
6250th U.S. Army Hospital at Fort Lewis, Washington (2014)
6251st U.S. Army Hospital at Tucson, Arizona (2014)
6252nd U.S. Army Hospital at Fort Ord, California (2014)
6253rd U.S. Army Hospital at Fort Carson, Colorado (2014)

The United States Army Reserve maintained these Table of Distribution and Allowances (TDA) hospitals, designed to augment 'existing Army hospitals' in the event of war. In 2014 all of these hospitals were inactivated and replaced by USAR Medical Backfill Battalions as part of the Total Army Analysis 15–19.

Medical commands 
United States Army Medical Command, Vietnam, Long Binh Post, Republic of Vietnam, 30 April 1972
United States Army Medical Command, Europe, Heidelberg, Germany, 21 September 1978
7th Medical Command, Heidelberg, Germany, 15 October 1994
30th Medical Command, reorganized and redesignated as the 30th Medical Brigade
44th Medical Command, reorganized and redesignated as the 44th Medical Brigade, 21 April 2010

Medical brigades 
7th Medical Brigade
18th Medical Brigade
Fort Meade, Maryland, 16 December 1970
Reorganized and redesignated 16 August 1984, as the 18th Medical Command
44th Medical Brigade
Fort Meade, Maryland, 19 March 1973
Reorganized and redesignated 16 October 2001, as the 44th Medical Command
(44th Medical Command again reorganized and redesignated as the 44th Medical Brigade, 21 April 2010)
112th Medical Brigade, Ohio National Guard (1996)
213th Medical Brigade, Mississippi National Guard, consolidated with the 134th Combat Support Hospital on 1 September 1995, with consolidated organization flagged as the 134th Combat Support Hospital
807th Medical Brigade, reorganized and redesignated 807th Medical Command, 17 September 2002

Hospital centers 
Named Hospital Centers, American Expeditionary Force
Hospital Center, Allerey, France, March 1919
Hospital Center, Basoilles, France, May 1919
Hospital Center, Beau Desert, France, June 1919
Hospital Center, Beaune, France, March 1919
Hospital Center, Clermont-Ferrand, France,
Hospital Center, Commercy, France, January 1919
Hospital Center, Joue-les-Tours, France, June 1919
Hospital Center, Kerhuon, France, July 1919
Hospital Center, Langres, France, January 1919
Hospital Center, Limoges, France, February 1919
Hospital Center, Mars-sur-Allier, France, May 1919
Hospital Center, Mesves, France, May 1919
Hospital Center, Nantes, France, May 1919
Hospital Center, Pau, France, December 1918
Hospital Center, Perigueux, France, May 1919
Hospital Center, Rimaucourt, France, May 1919
Hospital Center, Riviera, France, June 1919
Hospital Center, Savenay, France, July 1919
Hospital Center, Toul, France, May 1919
Hospital Center, Vannes, France, June 1919
Hospital Center, Vichy, France, April 1919
Hospital Center, Vittel-Contrexeville, France, January 1919

Numbered hospital centers
I Hospital Group (Provisional), Tauton, Somerset, United Kingdom, assets used to form the 801st Hospital Center
II Hospital Group (Provisional), Blandford, Dorset,  United Kingdom, assets used to form the 802nd Hospital Center
III Hospital Group (Provisional), Chippenham, Wiltshire, United Kingdom, assets used to form the 803rd Hospital Center
IV Hospital Group (Provisional), Cirencester, Glostershire, United Kingdom, assets used to form the 15th Hospital Center 
V Hospital Group (Provisional), Great Malvern, Worcestershire, United Kingdom, assets used to form the 12th Hospital Center, March 1944
VI Hospital Group (Provisional), Whitchurch, Flintshire, United Kingdom, assets used to form the 804th Hospital Center
VII Hospital Group (Provisional), Newmarket, Cambshire, United Kingdom, assets used to form the 805th Hospital Center
2nd Hospital Center, reorganized and redesignated as 2nd Medical Brigade, 17 September 1992
9th Hospital Center, 
12th Hospital Center
15th Hospital Center
26th Hospital Center End of World War II
27th Hospital Center End of World War II
28th Hospital Center End of World War II
30th Hospital Center
Philippine Islands, 25 January 1946
Atlanta, Georgia, 31 March 1963
Reorganized and redesignated 330th Medical Brigade, 16 April 1993
549th Hospital Center, Rohrbach, Germany, 14 December 1962
801st Hospital Center
802nd Hospital Center
803rd Hospital Center
804th Hospital Center
England, January 1946
Reorganized and redesignated as 804th Medical Brigade, 16 September 1993
805th Hospital Center
807th Hospital Center
Camp Sibert, Alabama, 27 October 1945
Oklahoma City, Oklahoma, 1 December 1950
Reorganized and redesignated as 807th Medical Brigade, 1 October 1976
808th Hospital Center
809th Hospital Center
810th Hospital Center
811th Hospital Center
812th Hospital Center
813th Hospital Center
814th Hospital Center
815th Hospital Center
816th Hospital Center
817th Hospital Center
818th Hospital Center
Belgium, 31 January 1946
Reorganized and redesignated as 818th Medical Brigade, 17 September 1992
819th Hospital Center, Harbord Barracks, Orleans, France
820th Hospital Center
821st Hospital Center End of World War II
6810th Hospital Center (Provisional), Whitchurch, Flintshire, United Kingdom, assets used to form the 804th Hospital Center, June 1944
Manila Hospital Center, Philippines, January 1942

Medical groups 
1st Medical Group
Fort Benning, Georgia, 12 November 1945
Verdun, France, 24 March 1962
Reorganized and redesignated as 1st Medical Brigade, Fort Hood, Texas, 6 June 2000
30th Medical Group
Fort Benning Georgia, 6 June 1949
Reorganized and redesignated as 30th Medical Brigade 17 June 1993
31st Medical Group
39th Medical Group
Fort Devens, Massachusetts, September 1958
Fort Bragg, North Carolina, 25 March 1971
43rd Medical Group, Nha Trang, Republic of Vietnam, 7 February 1970.
55th Medical Group
Republic of Vietnam, 25 June 1970 The Group Headquarters had actually been reduced to zero strength on June 15, 1969.
Fort Bragg, North Carolina, 21 September 1974
Fort Bragg, North Carolina, April 21, 2010
62nd Medical Group, Fort Lewis, Washington, reorganized and redesignated 62nd Medical Brigade, 16 October 2001
64th Medical Group 
(1945) 
(1955-?)
65th Medical Group
Germany, 31 January 1946
Fort Lewis, Washington, 21 June 1971
67th Medical Group 
20 November 1945 at Camp Kilmer, New Jersey
20 January 1972 at Fort Lewis, Washington
68th Medical Group
27 June 1946 in Germany
30 June 1972 at Fort Lewis, Washington
15 December 1994 in Germany
69th Medical Group
Fort Bragg, North Carolina, 1 November 1945
Reorganized and redesignated 332nd Medical Group, 5 October 1948
80th Medical Group, End of World War II 
112th Medical Group, reorganized and redesignated as 112th Medical Brigade, 1 July 1975
133rd Medical Group
135th Medical Group, End of World War II
175th Medical Group, California National Guard, reorganized and redesignated 1 January 1976 as 175th Medical Brigade
213th Medical Group, Mississippi National Guard, reorganized and redesignated 1 March 1975 as 213th Medical Brigade
332nd Medical Group
Fort Bragg, North Carolina, 1 November 1945
Reorganized and redesignated as 332nd Medical Brigade, 5 October 1948
338th Medical Group
Altoona, Pennsylvania, 28 April 1959
Reorganized and redesignated 338th Medical Brigade, 17 September 2002
426th Medical Group
Los Angeles, California, 1 January 1958
Reorganized and redesignated 426th Medical Brigade, 16 September 1993

Sanitary trains
Sanitary Trains were the division-level medical support unit for divisions in the American Expeditionary Force
1st Sanitary Train, 1st Division, Carlisle Barracks, Pennsylvania, reorganized and redesignated as the 1st Medical Regiment, 1st Division, 10 February 1921
2nd Sanitary Train, 2nd Division, Camp Travis, Texas, reorganized and redesignated as the 2nd Medical Regiment, 17 February 1921
3rd Sanitary Train, 3rd Division, Camp Pike, Arkansas, reorganized and redesignated as the 3rd Medical Regiment, 18 February 1921
4th Sanitary Train, 4th Division, Camp Lewis, Washington,  reorganized and redesignated as the 4th Medical Regiment, 12 February 1921
5th Sanitary Train, 5th Division, Camp Jackson, South Carolina, reorganized and redesignated as the 5th Medical Regiment, 11 February 1921
6th Sanitary Train, 6th Division, Camp Grant, Illinois, reorganized and redesignated as the 6th Medical Regiment, 28 February 1921
7th Sanitary Train, 7th Division, Camp Meade, Maryland, reorganized and redesignated as the 7th Medical Regiment, 15 February 1921
8th Sanitary Train, 8th Division
Camp Lee, Virginia, 15 February 1919
Reconstituted as the 8th Medical Battalion, 8th Division, 2 October 1939
9th Sanitary Train, 9th Division, Camp Sheridan, Alabama, February 1919
10th Sanitary Train, 10th Division, Camp Funston, Kansas, February 1919
11th Sanitary Train, 11th Division, Camp Meade, Maryland, February 1919
12th Sanitary Train, 12th Division, Camp Devens, Massachusetts, January 1919
13th Sanitary Train, 13th Division, Camp Lewis, Washington, March 1919
14th Sanitary Train, 14th Division, Camp Custer, Michigan, February 1919
15th Sanitary Train, 15th Division, Camp Logan, Texas, February 1919
16th Sanitary Train, 16th Division, Camp Kearny, California, February 1919
17th Sanitary Train was never organized
18th Sanitary Train, 18th Division, Camp Travis, Texas, February 1919
19th Sanitary Train, 19th Division, Camp Dodge, Iowa, January 1919
20th Sanitary Train, 20th Division, Camp Sevier, South Carolina, February 1919
21st through 100th Sanitary Trains were not organized
101st Sanitary Train, 26th Division, Camp Devens, Massachusetts, April 1919
102nd Sanitary Train, 27th Division, Camp Upton, New York, April 1919
103rd Sanitary Train, 28th Division, Camp Dix, New Jersey, 18 May 1919
104th Sanitary Train, 29th Division, Camp Meade, Maryland, June 1919
105th Sanitary Train, 30th Division, Camp Jackson, South Carolina, April 1919
106th Sanitary Train, 31st Division, Camp Gordon, Georgia, June 1919
107th Sanitary Train, 32nd Division, Camp Grant, Illinois, May 1919
108th Sanitary Train, 33rd Division, Camp Grant, Illinois, June 1919
109th Sanitary Train, 34th Division, Camp Grant, Illinois, February 1919
110th Sanitary Train, 35th Division, Camp Funston, Kansas, May 1919
111th Sanitary Train, 36th Division, Camp Bowie, Texas, June 1919
112th Sanitary Train, 37th Division
Camp Sherman, Ohio, 12 April 1919
Columbus, Ohio, reorganized and redesignated 112th Medical Regiment, 37th Division, 25 April 1921
113th Sanitary Train, 38th Division, Camp Zachary Taylor, Kentucky, February 1919
114th Sanitary Train, 39th Division, Cap Pike, Arkansas, July 1919
115th Sanitary Train, 40th Division, Presidio of San Francisco, California, May 1919
116th Sanitary Train, 41st Division, Camp Dodge, Iowa, May 1919
117th Sanitary Train, 42nd Division, Camp Custer, Michigan, May 1919
118th through 300th Sanitary Trains were not organized
301st Sanitary Train, 76th Division, Camp Devens, Massachusetts, June 1919
302nd Sanitary Train, 77th Division, Camp Upton, New York, May 1919
303rd Sanitary Train, 78th Division, Camp Dix, New Jersey, May 1919
304th Sanitary Train, 79th Division, Camp Dix, New Jersey, June 1919
305th Sanitary Train, 80th Division, Camp Dix, New Jersey, June 1919
306th Sanitary Train, 81st Division, Camp Jackson, South Carolina, June 1919
307th Sanitary Train, 82nd Division, Camp Dix, New Jersey, May 1919
308th Sanitary Train, 83rd Division, Camp Sherman, Ohio, February 1919
309th Sanitary Train, 84th Division, Camp Zachary Taylor, Kentucky, January 1919
310th Sanitary Train, 85th Division, Camp Custer, Michigan, April 1919
311th Sanitary Train, 86th Division 
Skeletonized November 1918 in France 
Camp Grant, Illinois, February 1919
312th Sanitary Train, 87th Division
Skeletonized December 1918 in France
Fort Dix, New Jersey, February 1919
313th Sanitary Train, 88th Division, Camp Dodge, Iowa, June 1919
314th Sanitary Train, 89th Division, Camp Dodge, Iowa, June 1919
315th Sanitary Train, 90th Division, Camp Bowie, Texas, June 1919
316th Sanitary Train, 91st Division, Camp Lewis, Washington, May 1919
317th Sanitary Train, 92nd Division, Camp Zachary Taylor, Kentucky, March 1919
318th and 319th Sanitary Trains were never organized
320th Sanitary Train, 95th Division, Camp Sherman, Ohio, December 1918
321st Sanitary Train, 96th Division, Camp Wadsworth, South Carolina, January 1919
322nd Sanitary Train, Camp Cody, New Mexico, December 1918

Medical regiments
1st Medical Regiment, Camp Bend, Oregon, reorganized and redesignated as the 1st Medical Group, 1 September 1943
2nd Medical Regiment, Fort Sam Houston, Texas, reorganized and redesignated as the 2nd Medical Battalion 10 October 1939
3rd Medical Regiment
Camp Lewis, Washington, 31 October 1922
Letterman General Hospital, June 1930
Presidio of San Francisco, California, reorganized and redesignated as the 3rd Medical Battalion, 13 October 1939
4th Medical Regiment
Camp Lewis, Washington, 21 September 1921
Fort Benning, Georgia, reorganized and redesignated as the 4th Medical Battalion, 19 October 1939
5th Medical Regiment
Camp Jackson, South Carolina, 15 September 1921
Reorganized and redesignated as the 4th Medical Battalion, 1 July 1940
6th Medical Regiment
Camp Grant, Illinois, 24 September 1921
Reorganized and redesignated as the 7th Medical Battalion and assigned to the 7th Division, 1 July 1940
7th Medical Regiment
Camp Meade, Maryland, 10 September 1921
Reorganized and redesignated as the 7th Medical Battalion, 26 September 1939
15th Medical Regiment, reorganized and redesignated 65th Medical Regiment, 28 May 1941
16th Medical Regiment, disbanded 8 September 1943
30th Medical Regiment, reorganized and redesignated 30th Medical Group, 8 September 1943
65th Medical Regiment, reorganized and redesignated 65th Medical Group, 10 March 1944
67th Medical Regiment, reorganized and redesignated 67th Medical Group, 15 September 1943
69th Medical Regiment,  reorganized and redesignated 69th Medical Group, 4 September 1943
112th Medical Regiment, 37th Infantry Division, reorganized and redesignated 112th Medical Battalion, 37th Infantry Division, 16 January 1942
134th Medical Regiment, Camp Upton, New York, reorganized and redesignated 134th Medical Group, 15 September 1943

Medical battalions
1st Medical Battalion, 1st Infantry Division 
Fort Riley Kansas, 15 May 1985
Reorganized and redesignated 201st Support Battalion, 1st Infantry Division
2nd Medical Battalion
Reorganized and redesignated 302nd Support Battalion, 2nd Infantry Division
3rd Medical Battalion
Reorganized and redesignated 203rd Support Battalion, 3rd Infantry Division
4th Medical Battalion
Reorganized and redesignated as the 5th Medical Battalion, 5th Infantry Division
Reorganized and redesignated as the 5th Support Battalion, 5th Infantry Division
5th Medical Battalion
Reorganized and redesignated as the 204th Support Battalion, 4th Infantry Division
6th Medical Battalion, reorganized and redesignated as the 7th Medical Battalion, 7th Division, 1 July 1940
7th Medical Battalion, reorganized and redesignated as the 6th Medical Battalion, 1 July 1940
8th Medical Battalion, 8th Division, redesignated 1st Medical Battalion, 1st Division, 1 July 1940
11th Medical Battalion, 11th Air Assault Division, Fort Benning, Georgia, 1 July 1965
12th Medical Battalion, End of World War II
13th Medical Battalion, End of World War II
15th Medical Battalion, reorganized and redesignated as the 2d Forward Support Battalion, 1st Cavalry Division, 1 October 1984
23rd Medical Battalion, Americal Division, Fort Lewis, Washington, November 1971
26th Medical Battalion, Fort Buchanan, Puerto Rico, inactivated 1 September 1943; Disbanded 11 November 1944
28th Medical Battalion, 28th Infantry Division, Camp Shelby. Mississippi, 27 October 1945
32nd Medical Battalion
Fort Sam Houston, Texas, 30 April 1948
Redesignated 132nd Medical Battalion, 1992
47th Medical Battalion, 1st Armored Division
Camp Kilmer, New Jersey, 10 April 1946
Fort Polk, Louisiana, 23 December 1957
Reorganized and redesignated as the 47th Support Battalion, 1st Armored Division
Germany, 15 September 1985
51st Medical Battalion, Italy, 30 September 1945
53rd Medical Battalion, Germany, reduced to zero strength18 December 1945
54th Medical Battalion, Italy, 8 September 1945
55th Medical Battalion
Germany, 3 March 1946
Reorganized and redesignated 55th Medical Group, 20 December 1956
59th Medical Battalion, End of World War II
61st Medical Battalion
France, 12 November 1945
Fort Lewis, Washington, 18 February 1972
62nd Medical Battalion, 13 November 1945
70th Medical Battalion, End of World War II
71st Medical Battalion, End of World War II
85th Medical Battalion, Germany, 31 January 1946
95th Medical Battalion, End of World War II
106th Medical Battalion, 31st Infantry Division, reorganized and redesignated 213th Medical Group, 1 February 1972
112th Medical Battalion, Columbus, Ohio, reorganized and redesignated 112th Medical Group, 1 May 1973
118th Medical Battalion, 43rd Infantry Division, Camp Stoneman, California, 14 October 1945
120th Medical Battalion, 45th Infantry Division, Camp Bowie, Texas, 17–24 November 1945
132nd Medical Battalion Redesignated 32nd Medical Brigade, 1 October 2002
135th Medical Battalion, End of World War II
151st Medical Battalion, End of World War II
168th Medical Battalion
Camp Shanks, New York, 30 October 1945
Fort Lewis, Washington, 21 June 1971
180th Medical Battalion, Camp Miles Standish, Massachusetts, 23 November 1945
232nd Medical Composite Battalion, Italy, 12 May 1946
261st Medical Battalion, France, 28 January 1945
313th Medical Battalion, 88th Infantry Division, Italy, 15 May 1947
414th Medical Battalion, Indianapolis, Indiana, 3 April 1953
422nd Medical Battalion, Albany, New York, 31 July 1950
436th Medical Battalion
Camp Myles Standish, Massachusetts, 23 November 1945
Greenville, Texas, 15 December 1950
439th Medical Battalion, Millington, Tennessee, 15 June 1999

Auxiliary surgical groups
1st Auxiliary Surgical Group
2nd Auxiliary Surgical Group, 14 September 1945
3rd Auxiliary Surgical Group
Germany, 6 October 1945
Redesignated 3rd Medical Command, 16 March 1991
4th Auxiliary Surgical Group
Germany, 28 September 1945
Redesignated 4th Medical Brigade 17 July 1988
5th Auxiliary Surgical Group 
Camp Silbert, Alabama, 13 November 1945
Redesignated 5th Medical Group, 20 April 1953

Air ambulance units

Air Ambulance Companies
45th Medical Company (Air Ambulance), Germany
57th Medical Company (Air Ambulance), Fort Bragg, North Carolina, January 2007
498th Medical Company (Air Ambulance), at Fort Benning, Georgia

Helicopter Ambulance Detachments
57th Medical Detachment (Helicopter Ambulance), reorganized and redesignated as the 57th Medical Company (Air Ambulance), 16 November 1992

Medical hospital ship companies
200th Medical Hospital Ship Company, US Army Hospital Ship Louis A. Milne, 22 August 1946
202nd Medical Hospital Ship Company, US Army Hospital Ship Shamrock, 18 December 1945
203rd Medical Hospital Ship Company, US Army Hospital Ship Algonquin, 11 January 1946
204th Medical Hospital Ship Company, US Army Hospital Ship Acadia, 11 February 1946
206th Medical Hospital Ship Company, US Army Hospital Ship Thistle, 29 January 1946
208th Medical Hospital Ship Company, US Army Hospital Ship Château Thierry, 11 February 1946
209th Medical Hospital Ship Company, US Army Hospital Ship Larkspur, 11 February 1946
211th Medical Hospital Ship Company, US Army Hospital Ship Emily H. M. Weder, 18 December 1945
212th Medical Hospital Ship Company, US Army Hospital Ship Marigold, 25 January 1946
217th Medical Hospital Ship Company, US Army Hospital Ship St. Olaf, 28 December 1945
218th Medical Hospital Ship Company, US Army Hospital Ship Dogwood, 25 January 1946
219th Medical Hospital Ship Company, US Army Hospital Ship Wisteria, 22 July 1946
220th Medical Hospital Ship Company, US Army Hospital Ship Blanche F. Sigman, 24 May 1946
234th Medical Hospital Ship Company, US Army Hospital Ship Republic, at sea, 11 February 1946
235th Medical Hospital Ship Company, US Army Hospital Ship Frances Y. Slanger, 7 January 1946
US Army Hospital Ship Ernest Hinds, 17 October 1945
US Army Hospital Ship John L. Clem, 17 October 1945
US Army Hospital Ship Seminole, 7 January 1946
US Army Hospital Ship Jarrett M. Huddleston, 7 January 1946
US Army Hospital Ship John J. Meany, 25 January 1946
US Army Hospital Ship St. Mihiel, 21 March 1946
US Army Hospital Ship Aleda E. Lutz, 6 April 1946
US Army Hospital Ship Earnestine Kornada, 9 October 1946
US Army Hospital Ship Charles A. Stafford, 2 November 1946

Medical hospital ship platoons
1st Medical Hospital Ship Platoon
2nd Medical Hospital Ship Platoon 
3rd Medical Hospital Ship Platoon 
4th Medical Hospital Ship Platoon
5th Medical Hospital Ship Platoon
6th Medical Hospital Ship Platoon 
7th Medical Hospital Ship Platoon
8th Medical Hospital Ship Platoon
9th Medical Hospital Ship Platoon 
10th Medical Hospital Ship Platoon 
11th Medical Hospital Ship Platoon 
15th Medical Hospital Ship Platoon
16th Medical Hospital Ship Platoon 
23rd Medical Hospital Ship Platoon
26th Medical Hospital Ship Platoon 
27th Medical Hospital Ship Platoon
28th Medical Hospital Ship Platoon
29th Medical Hospital Ship Platoon
30th Medical Hospital Ship Platoon
31st Medical Hospital Ship Platoon 
32nd Medical Hospital Ship Platoon
33rd Medical Hospital Ship Platoon 
34th Medical Hospital Ship Platoon
35th Medical Hospital Ship Platoon 
36th Medical Hospital Ship Platoon
37th Medical Hospital Ship Platoon
38th Medical Hospital Ship Platoon
40th Medical Hospital Ship Platoon
451st Medical Hospital Ship Platoon 
452nd Medical Hospital Ship Platoon
453rd Medical Hospital Ship Platoon
454th Medical Hospital Ship Platoon
466th Medical Hospital Ship Platoon
Philippine Islands, 10 November 1945
Johnson City, Tennessee, 1 December 1950
Redesignated as the 1466th Medical Detachment, 14 July 1992
468th Medical Hospital Ship Platoon
481st Medical Hospital Ship Platoon
485th Medical Hospital Ship Platoon
487th Medical Hospital Ship Platoon
504th Medical Hospital Ship Platoon
506th Medical Hospital Ship Platoon 
511th Medical Hospital Ship Platoon
512th Medical Hospital Ship Platoon 
520th Medical Hospital Ship Platoon
521st Medical Hospital Ship Platoon 
524th Medical Hospital Ship Platoon 
528th Medical Hospital Ship Platoon
531st Medical Hospital Ship Platoon
532nd Medical Hospital Ship Platoon
533rd Medical Hospital Ship Platoon
534th Medical Hospital Ship Platoon
537th Medical Hospital Ship Platoon
539th Medical Hospital Ship Platoon
540th Medical Hospital Ship Platoon
541st Medical Hospital Ship Platoon
542nd Medical Hospital Ship Platoon
543rd Medical Hospital Ship Platoon
544th Medical Hospital Ship Platoon
546th Medical Hospital Ship Platoon
547th Medical Hospital Ship Platoon
Fort Hamilton, New York, 29 September 1945
Redesignated as the 993rd Medical Hospital Ship Platoon, 25 March 1948
548th Medical Hospital Ship Platoon
Camp Anza, California, 20 November 1945
Redesignated as the 994th Medical Hospital Ship Platoon, 19 April 1948
549th Medical Hospital Ship Platoon
550th Medical Hospital Ship Platoon
553rd Medical Hospital Ship Platoon
554th Medical Hospital Ship Platoon
556th Medical Hospital Ship Platoon
557th Medical Hospital Ship Platoon
558th Medical Hospital Ship Platoon
559th Medical Hospital Ship Platoon
560th Medical Hospital Ship Platoon
562nd Medical Hospital Ship Platoon
564th Medical Hospital Ship Platoon
565th Medical Hospital Ship Platoon
568th Medical Hospital Ship Platoon
571st Medical Hospital Ship Platoon
573rd Medical Hospital Ship Platoon
576th Medical Hospital Ship Platoon
Seattle Port of Embarkation, Washington, 29 September 1945
Redesignated as the 972nd Medical Hospital Ship Platoon, 16 October 1947
578th Medical Hospital Ship Platoon
581st Medical Hospital Ship Platoon
584th Medical Hospital Ship Platoon 
593rd Medical Hospital Ship Platoon
597th Medical Hospital Ship Platoon
598th Medical Hospital Ship Platoon
599th Medical Hospital Ship Platoon
601st Medical Hospital Ship Platoon
606th Medical Hospital Ship Platoon
San Francisco Port of Embarkation, California, 6 October 1945
Redesignated as the 888th Medical Hospital Ship Platoon,  19 March 1948
608th Medical Hospital Ship Platoon
609th Medical Hospital Ship Platoon 
618th Medical Hospital Ship Platoon
619th Medical Hospital Ship Platoon
620th Medical Hospital Ship Platoon
621st Medical Hospital Ship Platoon
622nd Medical Hospital Ship Platoon
623rd Medical Hospital Ship Platoon
624th Medical Hospital Ship Platoon
627th Medical Hospital Ship Platoon
630th Medical Hospital Ship Platoon
642nd Medical Hospital Ship Platoon
643rd Medical Hospital Ship Platoon
644th Medical Hospital Ship Platoon
647th Medical Hospital Ship Platoon
648th Medical Hospital Ship Platoon
650th Medical Hospital Ship Platoon
663nd Medical Hospital Ship Platoon
664th Medical Hospital Ship Platoon
674th Medical Hospital Ship Platoon
675th Medical Hospital Ship Platoon
681st Medical Hospital Ship Platoon 
690th Medical Hospital Ship Platoon
697th Medical Hospital Ship Platoon
704th Medical Hospital Ship Platoon
710th Medical Hospital Ship Platoon
712th Medical Hospital Ship Platoon 
716th Medical Hospital Ship Platoon
719th Medical Hospital Ship Platoon
733nd Medical Hospital Ship Platoon 
738th Medical Hospital Ship Platoon
739th Medical Hospital Ship Platoon
748th Medical Hospital Ship Platoon
759th Medical Hospital Ship Platoon
778th Medical Hospital Ship Platoon 
785th Medical Hospital Ship Platoon
788th Medical Hospital Ship Platoon
808th Medical Hospital Ship Platoon
821st Medical Hospital Ship Platoon
824th Medical Hospital Ship Platoon
830th Medical Hospital Ship Platoon
832nd Medical Hospital Ship Platoon
848th Medical Hospital Ship Platoon
Philippine Islands, 10 November 1945
Evansville, Indiana, 22 September 1948
Redesignated as the 1848th Medical Detachment 14 July 1992
872nd Medical Hospital Ship Platoon
874th Medical Hospital Ship Platoon
882nd Medical Hospital Ship Platoon
885th Medical Hospital Ship Platoon
888th Medical Hospital Ship Platoon
Sturgeon Bay, Wisconsin, 18 January 1950
Redesignated as the 1888th Medical Detachment, 14 July 1992
905th Medical Hospital Ship Platoon
920th Medical Hospital Ship Platoon
923d Medical Hospital Ship Platoon
926th Medical Hospital Ship Platoon
927th Medical Hospital Ship Platoon
930th Medical Hospital Ship Platoon
972nd Medical Hospital Ship Platoon 
Butte, Montana, 31 August 1950
Redesignated as the 1972nd Medical Detachment, 14 July 1992
975th Medical Hospital Ship Platoon 
987th Medical Hospital Ship Platoon
Philippines, 25 March 1946
Kingsville, Texas, 8 March 1950
Redesignated as the 987th Medical Detachment, 16 September 1987
993rd Medical Hospital Ship Platoon
Springfield, Ohio, 19 October 1950
Redesignated as the 993rd Medical Detachment, 18 September 1987
994th Medical Hospital Ship Platoon
Mansfield, Ohio, 31 January 1950
redesignated as the 994th Medical Detachment 16 September 1987

Hospital trains
11th Hospital Train, France, 31 January 1946
22nd Ambulance Train
31st Ambulance Train, Germany
34th Ambulance Train, Germany
37th Ambulance Train, Germany
59th Hospital Train
Camp Sibert, Alabama, 13 November 1945
Redesignated as the 396th Hospital Train, 15 March 1948
66th Ambulance Train
80th Ambulance Train, Germany
396th Hospital Train, reorganized and redesignated as 338th Medical Group, 25 May 1950

Named medical depots
Alameda Medical Depot, 30 June 1955
Los Angeles Medical Depot, 10 March 1946
San Francisco Medical Depot, 31 January 1952
Medical Storage Depot, San Francisco Port of Embarkation, 15 May 1947

Numbered medical depots
2nd Medical Supply Depot, Algeria, disbanded 13 August 1944
4th Medical Supply Depot, Italy, inactivated 15 August 1944
5th Medical Depot, Fort Sam Houston, Texas, 30 November 1972
6th Medical Depot
7th Medical Supply Depot
12th Medical Supply Depot, Italy, 27 October 1945
20th Medical Depot Company, Iceland, 17 December 1943
22nd Medical Depot Company, Basra, Iraq, 17 December 1943
47th Medical Depot Company, Camp Butner, North Carolina, 14 November 1945
57th Medical Base Depot Company, Leghorn, Italy, 8 November 1947
60th Medical Base Depot Company, 12 May 1946
73rd Medical Base Depot Company, Italy, 29 June 1946

Medical laboratories
1st Medical Laboratory
Germany, 4 February 1946
Korea, 28 January 1955
Phu Bai, Republic of Vietnam, 6 February 1970
Fort Hood, Texas, 15 June 1993
15th Medical General Laboratory, Naples, Italy, 25 October 1945

Medical companies

Medical detachments
44th Medical Detachment (Pathology), Fort Bragg, North Carolina, 1 October 2018
57th Malaria Control Detachment, Brazil, 30 September 1945
935th Medical Detachment KO (Psychiatric), Long Binh, Republic of Vietnam

Medical research units
Army Industrial Hygiene Laboratory 
Armored Medical Research Laboratory (1961)
United States Army Medical Unit (1969), precursor of the United States Army Medical Research Institute of Infectious Diseases
United States Army Institute of Dental Research (1993), remnants now part of US Army Institute of Surgical Research (USAISR)
United States Army Environmental Hygiene Agency (1994), now USAPHC
United States Army Medical Research Unit-Brazil (1997)
Walter Reed Army Institute of Research Team, Vietnam
Walter Reed Army Institute of Research Field Epidemiological Survey Team (FEST) (Airborne), Vietnam

Ad hoc organizations
Aeromedical Isolation Team (2010)

References

External links 
https://www.aetn.org/__data/assets/pdf_file/0012/131142/ArmyNavyScript.pdf
https://www.thv11.com/article/news/hot-springs-leaders-worried-as-old-military-hospital-is-set-to-shutter/91-32573617-ff01-410a-90a9-d0493ca55a40

United States Army medical installations
Hospitals of the United States Army